This is a list of the bird species recorded in Peru. The avifauna of Peru has 1855 confirmed species, of which 117 are endemic, three have been introduced by humans, and 66 are rare or vagrants. An additional 35 species are hypothetical (see below).

Except as an entry is cited otherwise, the list of species is that of the South American Classification Committee (SACC) of the American Ornithological Society. The list's taxonomic treatment (designation and sequence of orders, families, and species) and nomenclature (common and scientific names) are also those of the SACC.

The following tags have been used to highlight certain categories of occurrence.

(V) Vagrant - a species that rarely or accidentally occurs in Peru
(E) Endemic - a species endemic to Peru
(I) Introduced - a species introduced to Peru as a consequence, direct or indirect, of human actions
(H) Hypothetical - a species recorded but with "no tangible evidence" according to the SACC

Rheas

Order: RheiformesFamily: Rheidae

The rheas are large flightless birds native to South America. Their feet have three toes rather than four which allows them to run faster. One species has been recorded in Peru.

Lesser rhea, Rhea pennata

Tinamous
Order: TinamiformesFamily: Tinamidae

The tinamous are one of the most ancient groups of bird. Although they look similar to other ground-dwelling birds like quail and grouse, they have no close relatives and are classified as a single family, Tinamidae, within their own order, the Tinamiformes. They are distantly related to the ratites (order Struthioniformes), which includes the rheas, emus, and kiwis. Peru contains the largest number of tinamous of any country. Twenty-seven species have been recorded there.

Tawny-breasted tinamou, Nothocercus julius
Highland tinamou, Nothocercus bonapartei
Hooded tinamou, Nothocercus nigrocapillus
Gray tinamou, Tinamus tao
Black tinamou, Tinamus osgoodi
Great tinamou, Tinamus major
White-throated tinamou, Tinamus guttatus
Cinereous tinamou, Crypturellus cinereus
Little tinamou, Crypturellus soui
Brown tinamou, Crypturellus obsoletus
Undulated tinamou, Crypturellus undulatus
Pale-browed tinamou, Crypturellus transfasciatus
Brazilian tinamou, Crypturellus strigulosus
Gray-legged tinamou, Crypturellus duidae
Black-capped tinamou, Crypturellus atrocapillus
Variegated tinamou, Crypturellus variegatus
Bartlett's tinamou, Crypturellus bartletti
Small-billed tinamou, Crypturellus parvirostris
Barred tinamou, Crypturellus casiquiare
Tataupa tinamou, Crypturellus tataupa
Red-winged tinamou, Rhynchotus rufescens
Taczanowski's tinamou, Nothoprocta taczanowskii
Ornate tinamou, Nothoprocta ornata
Andean tinamou, Nothoprocta pentlandii
Curve-billed tinamou, Nothoprocta curvirostris
Darwin's nothura, Nothura darwinii
Puna tinamou, Tinamotis pentlandii

Screamers
Order: AnseriformesFamily: Anhimidae

The screamers are a small family of birds related to the ducks. They are large, bulky birds, with a small downy head, long legs, and large feet which are only partially webbed. They have large spurs on their wings which are used in fights over mates and in territorial disputes. Two species have been recorded in Peru.

Horned screamer, Anhima cornuta
Southern screamer, Chauna torquata (V)

Ducks
Order: AnseriformesFamily: Anatidae

Anatidae includes the ducks and most duck-like waterfowl, such as geese and swans. These birds are adapted to an aquatic existence with webbed feet, flattened bills, and feathers that are excellent at shedding water due to an oily coating. Twenty-four species have been recorded in Peru.

Fulvous whistling-duck, Dendrocygna bicolor
White-faced whistling-duck, Dendrocygna viduata (V)
Black-bellied whistling-duck, Dendrocygna autumnalis
Orinoco goose, Oressochen jubatus
Andean goose, Oressochen melanopterus
Muscovy duck, Cairina moschata
Comb duck, Sarkidiornis sylvicola
Brazilian teal, Amazonetta brasiliensis
Torrent duck, Merganetta armata
Crested duck, Lophonetta specularioides
Puna teal, Spatula puna
Red shoveler, Spatula platalea
Northern shoveler, Spatula clypeata  (V)
Blue-winged teal, Spatula discors
Cinnamon teal, Spatula cyanoptera
Chiloe wigeon, Mareca sibilatrix (H)
White-cheeked pintail, Anas bahamensis
Yellow-billed pintail, Anas georgica
Andean teal, Anas andium
Yellow-billed teal, Anas flavirostris
Southern pochard, Netta erythrophthalma
Rosy-billed pochard, Netta peposaca (V)
Masked duck, Nomonyx dominicus
Ruddy duck, Oxyura jamaicensis

Guans

Order: GalliformesFamily: Cracidae

The Cracidae are large birds, similar in general appearance to turkeys. The guans and curassows live in trees, but the smaller chachalacas are found in more open scrubby habitats. They are generally dull-plumaged, but the curassows and some guans have colorful facial ornaments. Sixteen species have been recorded in Peru.

Sickle-winged guan, Chamaepetes goudotii
Bearded guan, Penelope barbata
Andean guan, Penelope montagnii
Spix's guan, Penelope jacquacu
Crested guan, Penelope purpurascens
White-winged guan, Penelope albipennis (E)
Blue-throated piping-guan, Pipile cumanensis
Wattled guan, Aburria aburri
Rufous-headed chachalaca, Ortalis erythroptera
Speckled chachalaca, Ortalis guttata
Nocturnal curassow, Nothocrax urumutum
Wattled curassow, Crax globulosa
Salvin's curassow, Mitu salvini
Razor-billed curassow, Mitu tuberosum
Sira curassow, Pauxi koepckeae (E)

New World quails
Order: GalliformesFamily: Odontophoridae

The New World quails are small, plump terrestrial birds only distantly related to the quails of the Old World, but named for their similar appearance and habits. Four species have been recorded in Peru.

Marbled wood-quail, Odontophorus gujanensis
Rufous-breasted wood-quail, Odontophorus speciosus
Stripe-faced wood-quail, Odontophorus balliviani
Starred wood-quail, Odontophorus stellatus

Flamingos

Order: PhoenicopteriformesFamily: Phoenicopteridae

Flamingos filter-feed on shellfish and algae. Their oddly shaped beaks are specially adapted to separate mud and silt from the food they consume and, uniquely, are used upside-down. Three species have been recorded in Peru.

Chilean flamingo, Phoenicopterus chilensis
Andean flamingo, Phoenicoparrus andinus
James's flamingo, Phoenicoparrus jamesi

Grebes
Order: PodicipediformesFamily: Podicipedidae

Grebes are small to medium-large freshwater diving birds. They have lobed toes and are excellent swimmers and divers. However, they have their feet placed far back on the body, making them quite ungainly on land. Seven species have been recorded in Peru.

White-tufted grebe, Rollandia rolland
Titicaca grebe, Rollandia microptera
Least grebe, Tachybaptus dominicus
Pied-billed grebe, Podilymbus podiceps
Great grebe, Podiceps major
Silvery grebe, Podiceps occipitalis
Junin grebe, Podiceps taczanowskii (E)

Pigeons
Order: ColumbiformesFamily: Columbidae

Pigeons and doves are stout-bodied birds with short necks and short slender bills with a fleshy cere. Twenty-nine species have been recorded in Peru.

Rock pigeon, Columba livia (I)
Scaled pigeon, Patagioenas speciosa
Picazuro pigeon, Patagioenas picazuro (V)
Spot-winged pigeon, Patagioenas maculosa
Band-tailed pigeon, Patagioenas fasciata
Pale-vented pigeon, Patagioenas cayennensis
Peruvian pigeon, Patagioenas oenops (E)
Plumbeous pigeon, Patagioenas plumbea
Ruddy pigeon, Patagioenas subvinacea
Sapphire quail-dove, Geotrygon saphirina
Ruddy quail-dove, Geotrygon montana
Violaceous quail-dove, Geotrygon violacea
White-tipped dove, Leptotila verreauxi
Ochre-bellied dove, Leptotila ochraceiventris
Gray-fronted dove, Leptotila rufaxilla
Pallid dove, Leptotila pallida
White-throated quail-dove, Zentrygon frenata
West Peruvian dove, Zenaida meloda
Eared dove, Zenaida auriculata
Blue ground dove, Claravis pretiosa
Maroon-chested ground dove, Paraclaravis mondetoura
Bare-faced ground dove, Metriopelia ceciliae
Black-winged ground dove, Metriopelia melanoptera
Golden-spotted ground dove, Metriopelia aymara
Plain-breasted ground dove, Columbina minuta
Ruddy ground dove, Columbina talpacoti
Ecuadorian ground dove, Columbina buckleyi
Picui ground dove, Columbina picui
Croaking ground dove, Columbina cruziana

Cuckoos
Order: CuculiformesFamily: Cuculidae

The family Cuculidae includes cuckoos, roadrunners, and anis. These birds are of variable size with slender bodies, long tails and strong legs. Seventeen species have been recorded in Peru.

Guira cuckoo, Guira guira (V)
Greater ani, Crotophaga major
Smooth-billed ani, Crotophaga ani
Groove-billed ani, Crotophaga sulcirostris
Striped cuckoo, Tapera naevia
Pheasant cuckoo, Dromococcyx phasianellus
Pavonine cuckoo, Dromococcyx pavoninus
Rufous-vented ground-cuckoo, Neomorphus geoffroyi
Red-billed ground-cuckoo, Neomorphus pucheranii
Little cuckoo, Coccycua minuta
Ash-colored cuckoo, Coccycua cinerea (V)
Squirrel cuckoo, Piaya cayana
Black-bellied cuckoo, Piaya melanogaster
Dark-billed cuckoo, Coccyzus melacoryphus
Yellow-billed cuckoo, Coccyzus americanus
Black-billed cuckoo, Coccyzus erythropthalmus
Gray-capped cuckoo, Coccyzus lansbergi

Oilbird
Order: SteatornithiformesFamily: Steatornithidae

The oilbird is a slim, long-winged bird related to the nightjars. It is nocturnal and a specialist feeder on the fruit of the oil palm.

Oilbird, Steatornis caripensis

Potoos
Order: NyctibiiformesFamily: Nyctibiidae

The potoos (sometimes called poor-me-ones) are large near passerine birds related to the nightjars and frogmouths. They are nocturnal insectivores which lack the bristles around the mouth found in the true nightjars. Six species have been recorded in Peru.

Rufous potoo, Phyllaemulor bracteatus
Great potoo, Nyctibius grandis
Long-tailed potoo, Nyctibius aethereus
Common potoo, Nyctibius griseus
Andean potoo, Nyctibius maculosus
White-winged potoo, Nyctibius leucopterus

Nightjars
Order: CaprimulgiformesFamily: Caprimulgidae

Nightjars are medium-sized nocturnal birds that usually nest on the ground. They have long wings, short legs, and very short bills. Most have small feet, of little use for walking, and long pointed wings. Their soft plumage is camouflaged to resemble bark or leaves. Twenty-one species have been recorded in Peru.

Nacunda nighthawk, Chordeiles nacunda
Sand-colored nighthawk, Chordeiles rupestris
Lesser nighthawk, Chordeiles acutipennis
Common nighthawk, Chordeiles minor
Short-tailed nighthawk, Lurocalis semitorquatus
Rufous-bellied nighthawk, Lurocalis rufiventris
Band-tailed nighthawk, Nyctiprogne leucopyga
Blackish nightjar, Nyctipolus nigrescens
Band-winged nightjar, Systellura longirostris
Tschudi's nightjar, Systellura decussata
Common pauraque, Nyctidromus albicollis
Scrub nightjar, Nyctidromus anthonyi
Swallow-tailed nightjar, Uropsalis segmentata
Lyre-tailed nightjar, Uropsalis lyra
Little nightjar, Setopagis parvula
Spot-tailed nightjar, Hydropsalis maculicaudus
Ladder-tailed nightjar, Hydropsalis climacocerca
Scissor-tailed nightjar, Hydropsalis torquata
Ocellated poorwill, Nyctiphrynus ocellatus
Silky-tailed nightjar, Antrostomus sericocaudatus
Rufous nightjar, Antrostomus rufus

Swifts
Order: ApodiformesFamily: Apodidae

Swifts are small birds which spend the majority of their lives flying. These birds have very short legs and never settle voluntarily on the ground, perching instead only on vertical surfaces. Many swifts have long swept-back wings which resemble a crescent or boomerang. Fourteen species have been recorded in Peru.

Spot-fronted swift, Cypseloides cherriei
White-chinned swift, Cypseloides cryptus
White-chested swift, Cypseloides lemosi
Chestnut-collared swift, Streptoprocne rutila
White-collared swift, Streptoprocne zonaris
Gray-rumped swift, Chaetura cinereiventris
Pale-rumped swift, Chaetura egregia
Chimney swift, Chaetura pelagica
Chapman's swift, Chaetura chapmani
Short-tailed swift, Chaetura brachyura
White-tipped swift, Aeronautes montivagus
Andean swift, Aeronautes andecolus
Fork-tailed palm-swift, Tachornis squamata
Lesser swallow-tailed swift, Panyptila cayennensis

Hummingbirds
Order: ApodiformesFamily: Trochilidae

Hummingbirds are small birds capable of hovering in mid-air due to the rapid flapping of their wings. They are the only birds that can fly backwards. One hundred twenty-six species have been recorded in Peru.

Fiery topaz, Topaza pyra
White-necked jacobin, Florisuga mellivora
White-tipped sicklebill, Eutoxeres aquila
Buff-tailed sicklebill, Eutoxeres condamini
Rufous-breasted hermit, Glaucis hirsutus
Pale-tailed barbthroat, Threnetes leucurus
Black-throated hermit, Phaethornis atrimentalis
Gray-chinned hermit, Phaethornis griseogularis
Reddish hermit, Phaethornis ruber
White-browed hermit, Phaethornis stuarti
Planalto hermit, Phaethornis pretrei
White-bearded hermit, Phaethornis hispidus
Green hermit, Phaethornis guy
Tawny-bellied hermit, Phaethornis syrmatophorus
Koepcke's hermit, Phaethornis koepckeae (E)
Needle-billed hermit, Phaethornis philippii
Straight-billed hermit, Phaethornis bourcieri
Long-billed hermit, Phaethornis longirostris
Great-billed hermit, Phaethornis malaris
Green-fronted lancebill, Doryfera ludovicae
Blue-fronted lancebill, Doryfera johannae
Geoffroy's daggerbill, Schistes geoffroyi
Brown violetear, Colibri delphinae
Lesser violetear, Colibri cyanotus
Sparkling violetear, Colibri coruscans
Purple-crowned fairy, Heliothryx barroti
Black-eared fairy, Heliothryx auritus
White-tailed goldenthroat, Polytmus guainumbi
Green-tailed goldenthroat, Polytmus theresiae
Ruby-topaz hummingbird, Chrysolampis mosquitus (V)
Black-throated mango, Anthracothorax nigricollis
Amethyst-throated sunangel, Heliangelus amethysticollis
Little sunangel, Heliangelus micraster
Purple-throated sunangel, Heliangelus viola
Royal sunangel, Heliangelus regalis
Wire-crested thorntail, Discosura popelairii
Black-bellied thorntail, Discosura langsdorffi
Rufous-crested coquette, Lophornis delattrei
Spangled coquette, Lophornis stictolophus
Butterfly coquette, Lophornis verreauxii
Ecuadorian piedtail, Phlogophilus hemileucurus
Peruvian piedtail, Phlogophilus harterti (E)
Speckled hummingbird, Adelomyia melanogenys
Long-tailed sylph, Aglaiocercus kingii
Bronze-tailed comet, Polyonymus caroli (E)
Gray-bellied comet, Taphrolesbia griseiventris (E)
Andean hillstar, Oreotrochilus estella
Green-headed hillstar, Oreotrochilus stolzmanni
Black-breasted hillstar, Oreotrochilus melanogaster (E)
Mountain avocetbill, Opisthoprora euryptera
Black-tailed trainbearer, Lesbia victoriae
Green-tailed trainbearer, Lesbia nuna
Purple-backed thornbill, Ramphomicron microrhynchum
Bearded mountaineer, Oreonympha nobilis (E)
Rufous-capped thornbill, Chalcostigma ruficeps
Olivaceous thornbill, Chalcostigma olivaceum
Blue-mantled thornbill, Chalcostigma stanleyi
Rainbow-bearded thornbill, Chalcostigma herrani
Tyrian metaltail, Metallura tyrianthina
Neblina metaltail, Metallura odomae
Coppery metaltail, Metallura theresiae (E)
Fire-throated metaltail, Metallura eupogon (E)
Scaled metaltail, Metallura aeneocauda
Black metaltail, Metallura phoebe (E)
Greenish puffleg, Haplophaedia aureliae
Buff-thighed puffleg, Haplophaedia assimilis
Glowing puffleg, Eriocnemis vestita
Sapphire-vented puffleg, Eriocnemis luciani
Emerald-bellied puffleg, Eriocnemis aline
Marvelous spatuletail, Loddigesia mirabilis (E)
Shining sunbeam, Aglaeactis cupripennis
White-tufted sunbeam, Aglaeactis castelnaudii (E)
Purple-backed sunbeam, Aglaeactis aliciae (E)
Bronzy Inca, Coeligena coeligena
Collared Inca, Coeligena torquata
Violet-throated starfrontlet, Coeligena violifer
Rainbow starfrontlet, Coeligena iris
Buff-winged starfrontlet, Coeligena lutetiae
Mountain velvetbreast, Lafresnaya lafresnayi
Sword-billed hummingbird, Ensifera ensifera
Great sapphirewing, Pterophanes cyanopterus
Chestnut-breasted coronet, Boissonneaua matthewsii
Booted racket-tail, Ocreatus underwoodii
Rufous-gaped hillstar, Urochroa bougueri
Rufous-vented whitetip, Urosticte ruficrissa
Pink-throated brilliant, Heliodoxa gularis
Rufous-webbed brilliant, Heliodoxa branickii (E)
Black-throated brilliant, Heliodoxa schreibersii
Gould's jewelfront, Heliodoxa aurescens
Fawn-breasted brilliant, Heliodoxa rubinoides
Violet-fronted brilliant, Heliodoxa leadbeateri
Giant hummingbird, Patagona gigas
Long-billed starthroat, Heliomaster longirostris
Blue-tufted starthroat, Heliomaster furcifer (V)
Purple-collared woodstar, Myrtis fanny
Chilean woodstar, Eulidia yarrellii (H)
Oasis hummingbird, Rhodopis vesper
Peruvian sheartail, Thaumastura cora
White-bellied woodstar, Chaetocercus mulsant
Little woodstar, Chaetocercus bombus
Short-tailed woodstar, Myrmia micrura
Amethyst woodstar, Calliphlox amethystina
Blue-tailed emerald, Chlorostilbon mellisugus
Glittering-bellied emerald, Chlorostilbon lucidus (V)
Blue-chinned sapphire, Chlorestes notata
Violet-headed hummingbird, Klais guimeti
Gray-breasted sabrewing, Campylopterus largipennis
Napo sabrewing, Campylopterus villaviscensio
Swallow-tailed hummingbird, Eupetomena macroura
White-vented plumeleteer, Chalybura buffonii
Crowned woodnymph, Thalurania colombica (H)
Fork-tailed woodnymph, Thalurania furcata
Many-spotted hummingbird, Taphrospilus hypostictus
Tumbes hummingbird, Thaumasius baeri
Spot-throated hummingbird, Thaumasius taczanowskii (E)
Olive-spotted hummingbird, Talaphorus chlorocercus
White-bellied hummingbird, Elliotomyia chionogaster
Green-and-white hummingbird, Elliotomyia viridicauda (E)
Rufous-tailed hummingbird, Amazilia tzacatl
Amazilia hummingbird, Amazilis amazilia
Andean emerald, Uranomitra franciae
Glittering-throated emerald, Chionomesa fimbriata
Sapphire-spangled emerald, Chionomesa lactea
Golden-tailed sapphire, Chrysuronia oenone
Violet-bellied hummingbird, Chlorestes julie
Rufous-throated sapphire, Hylocharis sapphirina
White-chinned sapphire, Chlorestes cyanus

Hoatzin

Order: OpisthocomiformesFamily: Opisthocomidae

The hoatzin is pheasant-sized, but much slimmer. It has a long tail and neck, but a small head with an unfeathered blue face and red eyes which are topped by a spiky crest. It is a weak flier which is found in the swamps of the Amazon and Orinoco rivers.

Hoatzin, Opisthocomus hoazin

Limpkin
Order: GruiformesFamily: Aramidae

The limpkin resembles a large rail. It has drab-brown plumage and a grayer head and neck.

Limpkin, Aramus guarauna

Trumpeters
Order: GruiformesFamily: Psophiidae

The trumpeters are dumpy birds with long necks and legs and chicken-like bills. They are named for the trumpeting call of the males. Two species have been recorded in Peru.

Gray-winged trumpeter, Psophia crepitans
Pale-winged trumpeter, Psophia leucoptera

Rails
Order: GruiformesFamily: Rallidae

Rallidae is a large family of small to medium-sized birds which includes the rails, crakes, coots, and gallinules. Typically they inhabit dense vegetation in damp environments near lakes, swamps, or rivers. In general they are shy and secretive birds, making them difficult to observe. Most species have strong legs and long toes which are well adapted to soft uneven surfaces. They tend to have short, rounded wings and to be weak fliers. Twenty-nine species have been recorded in Peru.

Mangrove rail, Rallus longirostris
Virginia rail, Rallus limicola
Bogota rail, Rallus semiplumbeus
Purple gallinule, Porphyrio martinica
Azure gallinule, Porphyrio flavirostris
Chestnut-headed crake, Anurolimnas castaneiceps
Russet-crowned crake, Anurolimnas viridis
Black-banded crake, Anurolimnas fasciatus
Rufous-sided crake, Laterallus melanophaius
White-throated crake, Laterallus albigularis (V)
Gray-breasted crake, Laterallus exilis
Black rail, Laterallus jamaicensis
Ocellated crake, Micropygia schomburgkii
Ash-throated crake, Mustelirallus albicollis
Paint-billed crake, Mustelirallus erythrops
Spotted rail, Pardirallus maculatus
Blackish rail, Pardirallus nigricans
Plumbeous rail, Pardirallus sanguinolentus
Uniform crake, Amaurolimnas concolor
Gray-cowled wood-rail, Aramides cajaneus
Rufous-necked wood-rail, Aramides axillaris
Red-winged wood-rail, Aramides calopterus
Sora, Porzana carolina
Common gallinule, Gallinula galeata
Red-fronted coot, Fulica rufifrons
Horned coot, Fulica cornuta (V)
Giant coot, Fulica gigantea
Slate-colored coot, Fulica ardesiaca
White-winged coot, Fulica leucoptera (V)

Finfoots
Order: GruiformesFamily: Heliornithidae

Heliornithidae is a small family of tropical birds with webbed lobes on their feet similar to those of grebes and coots. One species has been recorded in Peru.

Sungrebe, Heliornis fulica

Plovers
Order: CharadriiformesFamily: Charadriidae

The family Charadriidae includes the plovers, dotterels, and lapwings. They are small to medium-sized birds with compact bodies, short thick necks, and long, usually pointed, wings. They are found in open country worldwide, mostly in habitats near water. Fourteen species have been recorded in Peru.

American golden-plover, Pluvialis dominica
Black-bellied plover, Pluvialis squatarola
Tawny-throated dotterel, Oreopholus ruficollis
Pied lapwing, Vanellus cayanus
Southern lapwing, Vanellus chilensis
Andean lapwing, Vanellus resplendens
Rufous-chested dotterel, Charadrius modestus (V)
Killdeer, Charadrius vociferus
Semipalmated plover, Charadrius semipalmatus
Wilson's plover, Charadrius wilsonia
Collared plover, Charadrius collaris
Puna plover, Charadrius alticola
Snowy plover, Charadrius nivosus
Diademed sandpiper-plover, Phegornis mitchellii

Oystercatchers
Order: CharadriiformesFamily: Haematopodidae

The oystercatchers are large and noisy plover-like birds, with strong bills used for smashing or prising open molluscs. Two species have been recorded in Peru.

American oystercatcher, Haematopus palliatus
Blackish oystercatcher, Haematopus ater

Avocets and stilts
Order: CharadriiformesFamily: Recurvirostridae

Recurvirostridae is a family of large wading birds which includes the avocets and stilts. The avocets have long legs and long up-curved bills. The stilts have extremely long legs and long, thin, straight bills. Two species have been recorded in Peru.

Black-necked stilt, Himantopus mexicanus
Andean avocet, Recurvirostra andina

Thick-knees
Order: CharadriiformesFamily: Burhinidae

The thick-knees are a group of largely tropical waders in the family Burhinidae. They are found worldwide within the tropical zone, with some species also breeding in temperate Europe and Australia. They are medium to large waders with strong black or yellow-black bills, large yellow eyes, and cryptic plumage. Despite being classed as waders, most species have a preference for arid or semi-arid habitats. One species has been recorded in Peru.

Peruvian thick-knee, Burhinus superciliaris

Sandpipers
Order: CharadriiformesFamily: Scolopacidae

Scolopacidae is a large diverse family of small to medium-sized shorebirds including the sandpipers, curlews, godwits, shanks, tattlers, woodcocks, snipes, dowitchers, and phalaropes. The majority of these species eat small invertebrates picked out of the mud or soil. Variation in length of legs and bills enables multiple species to feed in the same habitat, particularly on the coast, without direct competition for food. Thirty-seven species have been recorded in Peru.

Upland sandpiper, Bartramia longicauda
Whimbrel, Numenius phaeopus
Long-billed curlew, Numenius americanus (H)
Hudsonian godwit, Limosa haemastica
Marbled godwit, Limosa fedoa
Ruddy turnstone, Arenaria interpres
Red knot, Calidris canutus
Surfbird, Calidris virgata
Ruff, Calidris pugnax (H)
Stilt sandpiper, Calidris himantopus
Curlew sandpiper, Calidris ferruginea (V)
Sanderling, Calidris alba
Dunlin, Calidris alpina (H)
Baird's sandpiper, Calidris bairdii
Least sandpiper, Calidris minutilla
White-rumped sandpiper, Calidris fuscicollis
Buff-breasted sandpiper, Calidris subruficollis
Pectoral sandpiper, Calidris melanotos
Semipalmated sandpiper, Calidris pusilla
Western sandpiper, Calidris mauri
Short-billed dowitcher, Limnodromus griseus
Long-billed dowitcher, Limnodromus scolopaceus (H)
Imperial snipe, Gallinago imperialis
Jameson's snipe, Gallinago jamesoni
Noble snipe, Gallinago nobilis (H)
Giant snipe, Gallinago undulata
Pantanal snipe, Gallinago paraguaiae
Puna snipe, Gallinago andina
Wilson's phalarope, Phalaropus tricolor
Red-necked phalarope, Phalaropus lobatus
Red phalarope, Phalaropus fulicarius
Spotted sandpiper, Actitis macularia
Solitary sandpiper, Tringa solitaria
Wandering tattler, Tringa incana
Greater yellowlegs, Tringa melanoleuca
Willet, Triga semipalmata
Lesser yellowlegs, Tringa flavipes

Seedsnipes
Order: CharadriiformesFamily: Thinocoridae

The seedsnipes are a small family of birds that superficially resemble sparrows. They have short legs and long wings and are herbivorous waders. Three species have been recorded in Peru.

Rufous-bellied seedsnipe, Attagis gayi
Gray-breasted seedsnipe, Thinocorus orbignyianus
Least seedsnipe, Thinocorus rumicivorus

Jacanas
Order: CharadriiformesFamily: Jacanidae

The jacanas are a family of waders found throughout the tropics. They are identifiable by their huge feet and claws which enable them to walk on floating vegetation in the shallow lakes that are their preferred habitat. One species has been recorded in Peru.

Wattled jacana, Jacana jacana

Skuas
Order: CharadriiformesFamily: Stercorariidae

The family Stercorariidae are, in general, medium to large birds, typically with gray or brown plumage, often with white markings on the wings. They nest on the ground in temperate and arctic regions and are long-distance migrants. Five species have been recorded in Peru.

Chilean skua, Stercorarius chilensis
South polar skua, Stercorarius maccormicki
Pomarine jaeger, Stercorarius pomarinus
Parasitic jaeger, Stercorarius parasiticus
Long-tailed jaeger, Stercorarius longicaudus

Skimmers
Order: CharadriiformesFamily: Rynchopidae

Skimmers are a small family of tropical tern-like birds. They have an elongated lower mandible which they use to feed by flying low over the water surface and skimming the water for small fish. One species has been recorded in Peru.

Black skimmer, Rynchops niger

Gulls
Order: CharadriiformesFamily: Laridae

Laridae is a family of medium to large seabirds and includes gulls, kittiwakes, and terns. Gulls are typically gray or white, often with black markings on the head or wings. They have longish bills and webbed feet. Terns are a group of generally medium to large seabirds typically with gray or white plumage, often with black markings on the head. Most terns hunt fish by diving but some pick insects off the surface of fresh water. Terns are generally long-lived birds, with several species known to live in excess of 30 years. Twenty-nine species of Laridae have been recorded in Peru.

Swallow-tailed gull, Creagrus furcatus
Black-legged kittiwake, Rissa tridactyla (V)
Sabine's gull, Xema sabini
Andean gull, Chroicocephalus serranus
Brown-hooded gull, Chroicocephalus maculipennis (V)
Gray-hooded gull, Chroicocephalus cirrocephalus
Gray gull, Leucophaeus modestus
Laughing gull, Leucophaeus atricilla
Franklin's gull, Leucophaeus pipixcan
Belcher's gull, Larus belcheri
Kelp gull, Larus dominicanus
Herring gull, Larus argentatus (V)
Black noddy, Anous minutus (V)
Sooty tern, Onychoprion fuscatus (V)
Least tern, Sternula antillarum (V)
Yellow-billed tern, Sternula superciliaris
Peruvian tern, Sternula lorata
Large-billed tern, Phaetusa simplex
Gull-billed tern, Gelochelidon nilotica
Caspian tern, Hydroprogne caspia (V)
Inca tern, Larosterna inca
Black tern, Chlidonias niger
Common tern, Sterna hirundo
Arctic tern, Sterna paradisaea
South American tern, Sterna hirundinacea
Snowy-crowned tern, Sterna trudeaui (V)
Elegant tern, Thalasseus elegans
Sandwich tern, Thalasseus sandvicensis
Royal tern, Thalasseus maximus

Sunbittern
Order: EurypygiformesFamily: Eurypygidae

The sunbittern is a bittern-like bird of tropical regions of the Americas and the sole member of the family Eurypygidae (sometimes spelled Eurypigidae) and genus Eurypyga.

Sunbittern, Eurypyga helias

Tropicbirds

Order: PhaethontiformesFamily: Phaethontidae

Tropicbirds are slender white birds of tropical oceans, with exceptionally long central tail feathers. Their heads and long wings have black markings. Two species have been recorded in Peru.

Red-billed tropicbird, Phaethon aethereus (V)
Red-tailed tropicbird, Phaethon rubricauda (H)

Penguins

Order: SphenisciformesFamily: Spheniscidae

The penguins are a group of aquatic, flightless birds living almost exclusively in the Southern Hemisphere. Most penguins feed on krill, fish, squid, and other forms of sealife caught while swimming underwater. Three species have been recorded in Peru.

King penguin, Aptenodytes patagonicus (H)
Humboldt penguin, Spheniscus humboldti
Magellanic penguin, Spheniscus magellanicus (V)

Albatrosses

Order: ProcellariiformesFamily: Diomedeidae

The albatrosses are among the largest of flying birds, and the great albatrosses from the genus Diomedea have the largest wingspans of any extant birds. Six species have been recorded in Peru.

Waved albatross, Phoebastria irrorata
Black-browed albatross, Thalassarche melanophris
Gray-headed albatross, Thalassarche chrysostoma (H)
Buller's albatross, Thalassarche bulleri
Salvin's albatross, Thalassarche salvini
Chatham albatross, Thalassarche eremita

Southern storm-petrels

Order: ProcellariiformesFamily: Oceanitidae

The storm-petrels are the smallest seabirds, relatives of the petrels, feeding on planktonic crustaceans and small fish picked from the surface, typically while hovering. The flight is fluttering and sometimes bat-like. Until 2018, this family's species were included with the other storm-petrels in family Hydrobatidae. Six species have been recorded in Peru.

White-bellied storm-petrel, Fregetta grallaria (H)
Black-bellied storm-petrel, Fregetta tropica (V)
Wilson's storm-petrel, Oceanites oceanicus
Elliot's storm-petrel, Oceanites gracilis
Gray-backed storm-petrel, Garrodia nereis (V)
White-faced storm-petrel, Pelagodroma marina (V)

Northern storm-petrels
Order: ProcellariiformesFamily: Hydrobatidae

Though the members of this family are similar in many respects to the southern storm-petrels, including their general appearance and habits, there are enough genetic differences to warrant their placement in a separate family. Seven species have been recorded in Peru.

Least storm-petrel, Hydrobates microsoma (H)
Wedge-rumped storm-petrel, Hydrobates tethys
Band-rumped storm-petrel, Hydrobates castro (H)
Leach's storm-petrel, Hydrobates leucorhoa (V)
Markham's storm-petrel, Hydrobates markhami
Hornby's storm-petrel, Hydrobates hornbyi
Black storm-petrel, Hydrobates melania

Shearwaters
Order: ProcellariiformesFamily: Procellariidae

The procellariids are the main group of medium-sized "true petrels", characterized by united nostrils with medium septum and a long outer functional primary. Twenty-five species have been recorded in Peru.

Southern giant-petrel, Macronectes giganteus
Northern giant-petrel, Macronectes halli
Southern fulmar, Fulmarus glacialoides
Cape petrel, Daption capense
Cook's petrel, Pterodroma cookii
Masatierra petrel, Pterodroma defilippiana
Kermadec petrel, Pterodroma neglecta
Galapagos petrel, Pterodroma phaeopygia
Juan Fernandez petrel, Pterodroma externa (H)
Broad-billed prion, Pachyptila vittata (V)
Antarctic prion, Pachyptila desolata
Slender-billed prion, Pachyptila belcheri
Gray petrel, Procellaria cinerea (V)
White-chinned petrel, Procellaria aequinoctialis
Parkinson's petrel, Procellaria parkinsoni
Westland petrel, Procellaria westlandica (H)
Wedge-tailed shearwater, Ardenna pacifica (H)
Buller's shearwater, Ardenna bulleri
Sooty shearwater, Ardenna grisea
Pink-footed shearwater, Ardenna creatopus
Flesh-footed shearwater, Ardenna carneipes (H)
Manx shearwater, Puffinus puffinus (V)
Galapagos shearwater, Puffinus subalaris (H)
Little shearwater, Puffinus assimilis (H)
Peruvian diving-petrel, Pelecanoides garnotii

Storks
Order: CiconiiformesFamily: Ciconiidae

Storks are large, long-legged, long-necked wading birds with long, stout bills. Storks are mute, but bill-clattering is an important mode of communication at the nest. Their nests can be large and may be reused for many years. Many species are migratory. Three species have been recorded in Peru.

Maguari stork, Ciconia maguari (V)
Jabiru, Jabiru mycteria
Wood stork, Mycteria americana

Frigatebirds

Order: SuliformesFamily: Fregatidae

Frigatebirds are large seabirds usually found over tropical oceans. They are large, black-and-white or completely black, with long wings and deeply forked tails. The males have colored inflatable throat pouches. They do not swim or walk and cannot take off from a flat surface. Having the largest wingspan-to-body-weight ratio of any bird, they are essentially aerial, able to stay aloft for more than a week. Two species have been recorded in Peru.

Magnificent frigatebird, Fregata magnificens
Great frigatebird, Fregata minor (V)

Boobies

Order: SuliformesFamily: Sulidae

The sulids comprise the gannets and boobies. Both groups are medium to large coastal seabirds that plunge-dive for fish. Seven species have been recorded in Peru.

Cape gannet, Morus capensis (V)
Blue-footed booby, Sula nebouxii
Peruvian booby, Sula variegata
Masked booby, Sula dactylatra
Nazca booby, Sula granti
Red-footed booby, Sula sula (V)
Brown booby, Sula leucogaster (V)

Anhingas
Order: SuliformesFamily: Anhingidae

Anhingas are often called "snake-birds" because of their long thin neck, which gives a snake-like appearance when they swim with their bodies submerged. The males have black and dark-brown plumage, an erectile crest on the nape, and a larger bill than the female. The females have much paler plumage especially on the neck and underparts. The darters have completely webbed feet and their legs are short and set far back on the body. Their plumage is somewhat permeable, like that of cormorants, and they spread their wings to dry after diving. One species has been recorded in Peru.

Anhinga, Anhinga anhinga

Cormorants
Order: SuliformesFamily: Phalacrocoracidae

Phalacrocoracidae is a family of medium to large coastal, fish-eating seabirds that includes cormorants and shags. Plumage coloration varies, with the majority having mainly dark plumage, some species being black-and-white, and a few being colorful. Three species have been recorded in Peru.

Red-legged cormorant, Phalacrocorax gaimardi
Neotropic cormorant, Phalacrocorax brasilianus
Guanay cormorant, Phalacrocorax bougainvillii

Pelicans
Order: PelecaniformesFamily: Pelecanidae

Pelicans are large water birds with a distinctive pouch under their beak. As with other members of the order Pelecaniformes, they have webbed feet with four toes. Two species have been recorded in Peru.

Brown pelican, Pelecanus occidentalis
Peruvian pelican, Pelecanus thagus

Herons
Order: PelecaniformesFamily: Ardeidae

The family Ardeidae contains the bitterns, herons, and egrets. Herons and egrets are medium to large wading birds with long necks and legs. Bitterns tend to be shorter necked and more wary. Members of Ardeidae fly with their necks retracted, unlike other long-necked birds such as storks, ibises, and spoonbills. Twenty-one species have been recorded in Peru.

Rufescent tiger-heron, Tigrisoma lineatum
Fasciated tiger-heron, Tigrisoma fasciatum
Bare-throated tiger-heron, Tigrisoma mexicanum
Agami heron, Agamia agami
Boat-billed heron, Cochlearius cochlearius
Zigzag heron, Zebrilus undulatus
Pinnated bittern, Botaurus pinnatus (H)
Least bittern, Ixobrychus exilis
Stripe-backed bittern, Ixobrychus involucris (V)
Black-crowned night-heron, Nycticorax nycticorax
Yellow-crowned night-heron, Nyctanassa violacea
Striated heron, Butorides striata
Cattle egret, Bubulcus ibis
Cocoi heron, Ardea cocoi
Great egret, Ardea alba
Whistling heron, Syrigma sibilatrix (V)
Capped heron, Pilherodius pileatus
Tricolored heron, Egretta tricolor
Reddish egret, Egretta rufescens (V)
Snowy egret, Egretta thula
Little blue heron, Egretta caerulea

Ibises

Order: PelecaniformesFamily: Threskiornithidae

Threskiornithidae is a family of large terrestrial and wading birds which includes the ibises and spoonbills. They have long, broad wings with 11 primary and about 20 secondary feathers. They are strong fliers and despite their size and weight, very capable soarers. Nine species have been recorded in Peru.

White ibis, Eudocimus albus
Scarlet ibis, Eudocimus ruber (V)
Puna ibis, Plegadis ridgwayi
Green ibis, Mesembrinibis cayennensis
Bare-faced ibis, Phimosus infuscatus (V)
Buff-necked ibis, Theristicus caudatus (V)
Andean ibis, Theristicus branickii
Black-faced ibis, Theristicus melanopis
Roseate spoonbill, Platalea ajaja

New World vultures
Order: CathartiformesFamily: Cathartidae

The New World vultures are not closely related to Old World vultures, but superficially resemble them because of convergent evolution. Like the Old World vultures, they are scavengers. However, unlike Old World vultures, which find carcasses by sight, New World vultures have a good sense of smell with which they locate carrion. Six species have been recorded in Peru.

King vulture, Sarcoramphus papa
Andean condor, Vultur gryphus
Black vulture, Coragyps atratus
Turkey vulture, Cathartes aura
Lesser yellow-headed vulture, Cathartes burrovianus
Greater yellow-headed vulture, Cathartes melambrotus

Osprey

Order: AccipitriformesFamily: Pandionidae

The family Pandionidae contains only one species, the osprey. The osprey is a medium-large raptor which is a specialist fish-eater with a worldwide distribution.

Osprey, Pandion haliaetus

Hawks
Order: AccipitriformesFamily: Accipitridae

Accipitridae is a family of birds of prey, which includes hawks, eagles, kites, harriers, and Old World vultures. These birds have powerful hooked beaks for tearing flesh from their prey, strong legs, powerful talons, and keen eyesight. Forty-seven species have been recorded in Peru.

Pearl kite, Gampsonyx swainsonii
White-tailed kite, Elanus leucurus
Hook-billed kite, Chondrohierax uncinatus
Gray-headed kite, Leptodon cayanensis
Swallow-tailed kite, Elanoides forficatus
Crested eagle, Morphnus guianensis
Harpy eagle, Harpia harpyja
Black hawk-eagle, Spizaetus tyrannus
Black-and-white hawk-eagle, Spizaetus melanoleucus
Ornate hawk-eagle, Spizaetus ornatus
Black-and-chestnut eagle, Spizaetus isidori
Black-collared hawk, Busarellus nigricollis
Snail kite, Rostrhamus sociabilis
Slender-billed kite, Helicolestes hamatus
Double-toothed kite, Harpagus bidentatus
Mississippi kite, Ictinia mississippiensis (V)
Plumbeous kite, Ictinia plumbea
Cinereous harrier, Circus cinereus
Long-winged harrier, Circus buffoni (H)
Gray-bellied hawk, Accipiter poliogaster
Sharp-shinned hawk, Accipiter striatus
Bicolored hawk, Accipiter bicolor
Tiny hawk, Microspizias superciliosus
Semicollared hawk, Microspizias collaris
Crane hawk, Geranospiza caerulescens
Slate-colored hawk, Buteogallus schistaceus
Common black hawk, Buteogallus anthracinus
Savanna hawk, Buteogallus meridionalis
Great black hawk, Buteogallus urubitinga
Solitary eagle, Buteogallus solitarius
Barred hawk, Morphnarchus princeps
Roadside hawk, Rupornis magnirostris
Harris's hawk, Parabuteo unicinctus
White-rumped hawk, Parabuteo leucorrhous
White-tailed hawk, Geranoaetus albicaudatus
Variable hawk, Geranoaetus polyosoma
Black-chested buzzard-eagle, Geranoaetus melanoleucus
White hawk, Pseudastur albicollis
Gray-backed hawk, Pseudastur occidentalis
Black-faced hawk, Leucopternis melanops
White-browed hawk, Leucopternis kuhli
Gray-lined hawk, Buteo nitidus
Broad-winged hawk, Buteo platypterus
White-throated hawk, Buteo albigula
Short-tailed hawk, Buteo brachyurus
Swainson's hawk, Buteo swainsoni (V)
Zone-tailed hawk, Buteo albonotatus

Barn owls
Order: StrigiformesFamily: Tytonidae

Barn owls are medium to large owls with large heads and characteristic heart-shaped faces. They have long strong legs with powerful talons. One species has been recorded in Peru.

Barn owl, Tyto alba

Owls
Order: StrigiformesFamily: Strigidae

The typical owls are small to large solitary nocturnal birds of prey. They have large forward-facing eyes and ears, a hawk-like beak, and a conspicuous circle of feathers around each eye called a facial disk. Twenty-nine species have been recorded in Peru.

White-throated screech-owl, Megascops albogularis
Tropical screech-owl, Megascops choliba
Koepcke's screech-owl, Megascops koepckeae
Rufescent screech-owl, Megascops ingens
Cinnamon screech-owl, Megascops petersoni
Cloud-forest screech-owl, Megascops marshalli
Foothill screech-owl, Megascops roraimae
Peruvian screech-owl, Megascops roboratus
Tawny-bellied screech-owl, Megascops watsonii
Crested owl, Lophostrix cristata
Spectacled owl, Pulsatrix perspicillata
Band-bellied owl, Pulsatrix melanota
Great horned owl, Bubo virginianus
Mottled owl, Strix virgata
Black-and-white owl, Strix nigrolineata
Black-banded owl, Strix huhula
Rufous-banded owl, Strix albitarsis
Andean pygmy-owl, Glaucidium jardinii
Yungas pygmy-owl, Glaucidium bolivianum
Subtropical pygmy-owl, Glaucidium parkeri
Amazonian pygmy-owl, Glaucidium hardyi
Ferruginous pygmy-owl, Glaucidium brasilianum
Peruvian pygmy-owl, Glaucidium peruanum
Long-whiskered owlet, Xenoglaux loweryi (E)
Burrowing owl, Athene cunicularia
Buff-fronted owl, Aegolius harrisii
Striped owl, Asio clamator
Stygian owl, Asio stygius
Short-eared owl, Asio flammeus

Trogons
Order: TrogoniformesFamily: Trogonidae

The family Trogonidae includes trogons and quetzals. Found in tropical woodlands worldwide, they feed on insects and fruit, and their broad bills and weak legs reflect their diet and arboreal habits. Although their flight is fast, they are reluctant to fly any distance. Trogons have soft, often colorful, feathers with distinctive male and female plumage. Twelve species have been recorded in Peru.

Pavonine quetzal, Pharomachrus pavoninus
Golden-headed quetzal, Pharomachrus auriceps
Crested quetzal, Pharomachrus antisianus
Ecuadorian trogon, Trogon mesurus
Black-tailed trogon, Trogon melanurus
Green-backed trogon, Trogon viridis
Gartered trogon, Trogon caligatus
Amazonian trogon, Trogon ramonianus
Blue-crowned trogon, Trogon curucui
Black-throated trogon, Trogon rufus (see note)
Collared trogon, Trogon collaris
Masked trogon, Trogon personatus

Motmots
Order: CoraciiformesFamily: Momotidae

The motmots have colorful plumage and long, graduated tails which they display by waggling back and forth. In most of the species, the barbs near the ends of the two longest (central) tail feathers are weak and fall off, leaving a length of bare shaft and creating a racket-shaped tail. Five species have been recorded in Peru.

Broad-billed motmot, Electron platyrhynchum
Rufous motmot, Baryphthengus martii
Whooping motmot, Momotus subrufescens
Amazonian motmot, Momotus momota
Andean motmot, Momotus aequatorialis

Kingfishers
Order: CoraciiformesFamily: Alcedinidae

Kingfishers are medium-sized birds with large heads, long pointed bills, short legs, and stubby tails. Five species have been recorded in Peru.

Ringed kingfisher, Megaceryle torquatus
Amazon kingfisher, Chloroceryle amazona
American pygmy kingfisher, Chloroceryle aenea
Green kingfisher, Chloroceryle americana
Green-and-rufous kingfisher, Chloroceryle inda

Jacamars
Order: GalbuliformesFamily: Galbulidae

The jacamars are near passerine birds from tropical South America with a range that extends up to Mexico. They feed on insects caught on the wing and are glossy, elegant birds with long bills and tails. They resemble the Old World bee-eaters, although they are more closely related to puffbirds. Thirteen species that have been recorded in Peru.

White-eared jacamar, Galbalcyrhynchus leucotis
Purus jacamar, Galbalcyrhynchus purusianus
White-throated jacamar, Brachygalba albogularis
Brown jacamar, Brachygalba lugubris
Yellow-billed jacamar, Galbula albirostris
Blue-cheeked jacamar, Galbula cyanicollis
White-chinned jacamar, Galbula tombacea
Bluish-fronted jacamar, Galbula cyanescens
Coppery-chested jacamar, Galbula pastazae (H)
Purplish jacamar, Galbula chalcothorax
Bronzy jacamar, Galbula leucogastra
Paradise jacamar, Galbula dea
Great jacamar, Jacamerops aureus

Puffbirds
Order: GalbuliformesFamily: Bucconidae

The puffbirds are related to the jacamars and have the same range, but lack the iridescent colors of that family. They are mainly brown, rufous, or gray, with large heads and flattened bills with hooked tips. The loose abundant plumage and short tails makes them look stout and puffy, giving rise to the English common name of the family. Twenty-four species have been recorded in Peru.

White-necked puffbird, Notharchus hyperrhynchus
Brown-banded puffbird, Notharchus ordii
Pied puffbird, Notharchus tectus
Chestnut-capped puffbird, Bucco macrodactylus
Spotted puffbird, Bucco tamatia
Collared puffbird, Bucco capensis
Barred puffbird, Nystalus radiatus
Western striolated-puffbird, Nystalus obamai
White-eared puffbird, Nystalus chacuru
White-chested puffbird, Malacoptila fusca
Semicollared puffbird, Malacoptila semicincta
Rufous-necked puffbird, Malacoptila rufa
White-whiskered puffbird, Malacoptila panamensis
Black-streaked puffbird, Malacoptila fulvogularis
Lanceolated monklet, Micromonacha lanceolata
Rusty-breasted nunlet, Nonnula rubecula
Fulvous-chinned nunlet, Nonnula sclateri
Brown nunlet, Nonnula brunnea
Rufous-capped nunlet, Nonnula ruficapilla
White-faced nunbird, Hapaloptila castanea
Black-fronted nunbird, Monasa nigrifrons
White-fronted nunbird, Monasa morphoeus
Yellow-billed nunbird, Monasa flavirostris
Swallow-winged puffbird, Chelidoptera tenebrosa

New World barbets
Order: PiciformesFamily: Capitonidae

The barbets are plump birds, with short necks and large heads. They get their name from the bristles which fringe their heavy bills. Most species are brightly colored. Seven species have been recorded in Peru.

Scarlet-crowned barbet, Capito aurovirens
Scarlet-banded barbet, Capito wallacei (E)
Gilded barbet, Capito auratus
Lemon-throated barbet, Eubucco richardsoni
Scarlet-hooded barbet, Eubucco tucinkae
Red-headed barbet, Eubucco bourcierii
Versicolored barbet, Eubucco versicolor

Toucans
Order: PiciformesFamily: Ramphastidae

Toucans are near passerine birds from the Neotropics. They are brightly marked and have enormous, colorful bills which in some species amount to half their body length. Nineteen species have been recorded in Peru.

Toco toucan, Ramphastos toco (V)
Yellow-throated toucan, Ramphastos ambiguus
White-throated toucan, Ramphastos tucanus
Choco toucan, Ramphastos brevis (V)
Channel-billed toucan, Ramphastos vitellinus
Southern emerald-toucanet, Aulacorhynchus albivitta
Chestnut-tipped toucanet, Aulacorhynchus derbianus
Yellow-browed toucanet, Aulacorhynchus huallagae (E)
Blue-banded toucanet, Aulacorhynchus coeruleicinctis
Gray-breasted mountain-toucan, Andigena hypoglauca
Hooded mountain-toucan, Andigena cucullata
Black-billed mountain-toucan, Andigena nigrirostris
Golden-collared toucanet, Selenidera reinwardtii
Lettered aracari, Pteroglossus inscriptus
Collared aracari, Pteroglossus torquatus
Chestnut-eared aracari, Pteroglossus castanotis
Many-banded aracari, Pteroglossus pluricinctus
Ivory-billed aracari, Pteroglossus azara
Curl-crested aracari, Pteroglossus beauharnaisii

Woodpeckers
Order: PiciformesFamily: Picidae

Woodpeckers are small to medium-sized birds with chisel-like beaks, short legs, stiff tails, and long tongues used for capturing insects. Some species have feet with two toes pointing forward and two backward, while several species have only three toes. Many woodpeckers have the habit of tapping noisily on tree trunks with their beaks. Thirty-nine species have been recorded in Peru.

Bar-breasted piculet, Picumnus aurifrons
Lafresnaye's piculet, Picumnus lafresnayi
Ecuadorian piculet, Picumnus sclateri
Speckle-chested piculet, Picumnus steindachneri (E)
Ocellated piculet, Picumnus dorbignyanus
White-wedged piculet, Picumnus albosquamatus
Rufous-breasted piculet, Picumnus rufiventris
Plain-breasted piculet, Picumnus castelnau
Fine-barred piculet, Picumnus subtilis
Olivaceous piculet, Picumnus olivaceus
White woodpecker, Melanerpes candidus (V)
Yellow-tufted woodpecker, Melanerpes cruentatus
Black-cheeked woodpecker, Melanerpes pucherani
Smoky-brown woodpecker, Dryobates fumigatus
Red-rumped woodpecker, Dryobates kirkii
Little woodpecker, Dryobates passerinus
Scarlet-backed woodpecker, Dryobates callonotus
Yellow-vented woodpecker, Dryobates dignus
Bar-bellied woodpecker, Dryobates nigriceps
Red-stained woodpecker, Dryobates affinis
Powerful woodpecker, Campephilus pollens
Crimson-bellied woodpecker, Campephilus haematogaster
Red-necked woodpecker, Campephilus rubricollis
Crimson-crested woodpecker, Campephilus melanoleucos
Guayaquil woodpecker, Campephilus gayaquilensis
Lineated woodpecker, Dryocopus lineatus
Ringed woodpecker, Celeus torquatus
Scale-breasted woodpecker, Celeus grammicus
Cream-colored woodpecker, Celeus flavus
Rufous-headed woodpecker, Celeus spectabilis
Chestnut woodpecker, Celeus elegans
White-throated woodpecker, Piculus leucolaemus
Yellow-throated woodpecker, Piculus flavigula
Golden-green woodpecker, Piculus chrysochloros
Golden-olive woodpecker, Colaptes rubiginosus
Crimson-mantled woodpecker, Colaptes rivolii
Black-necked woodpecker, Colaptes atricollis (E)
Spot-breasted woodpecker, Colaptes punctigula
Andean flicker, Colaptes rupicola

Falcons

Order: FalconiformesFamily: Falconidae

Falconidae is a family of diurnal birds of prey. They differ from hawks, eagles, and kites in that they kill with their beaks instead of their talons. Seventeen species have been recorded in Peru.

Laughing falcon, Herpetotheres cachinnans
Barred forest-falcon, Micrastur ruficollis
Lined forest-falcon, Micrastur gilvicollis
Slaty-backed forest-falcon, Micrastur mirandollei
Collared forest-falcon, Micrastur semitorquatus
Buckley's forest-falcon, Micrastur buckleyi
Crested caracara, Caracara plancus
Red-throated caracara, Ibycter americanus
Mountain caracara, Phalcoboenus megalopterus
Black caracara, Daptrius ater
Yellow-headed caracara, Milvago chimachima
American kestrel, Falco sparverius
Merlin, Falco columbarius
Bat falcon, Falco rufigularis
Orange-breasted falcon, Falco deiroleucus
Aplomado falcon, Falco femoralis
Peregrine falcon, Falco peregrinus

New World and African parrots
Order: PsittaciformesFamily: Psittacidae

Parrots are small to large birds with a characteristic curved beak. Their upper mandibles have slight mobility in the joint with the skull and they have a generally erect stance. All parrots are zygodactyl, having the four toes on each foot placed two at the front and two to the back. Fifty-three species have been recorded in Peru.

Scarlet-shouldered parrotlet, Touit huetii
Sapphire-rumped parrotlet, Touit purpuratus
Spot-winged parrotlet, Touit stictopterus
Mountain parakeet, Psilopsiagon aurifrons
Barred parakeet, Bolborhynchus lineola
Andean parakeet, Bolborhynchus orbygnesius
Amazonian parrotlet, Nannopsittaca dachilleae
Tui parakeet, Brotogeris sanctithomae
Canary-winged parakeet, Brotogeris versicolurus
Gray-cheeked parakeet, Brotogeris pyrrhoptera
Cobalt-winged parakeet, Brotogeris cyanoptera
Red-faced parrot, Hapalopsittaca pyrrhops
Black-winged parrot, Hapalopsittaca melanotis
Orange-cheeked parrot, Pyrilia barrabandi
Red-billed parrot, Pionus sordidus
Speckle-faced parrot, Pionus tumultuosus
Blue-headed parrot, Pionus menstruus
Bronze-winged parrot, Pionus chalcopterus
Short-tailed parrot, Graydidascalus brachyurus
Festive parrot, Amazona festiva
Yellow-crowned parrot, Amazona ochrocephala
Turquoise-fronted parrot, Amazona aestiva (V)
Mealy parrot, Amazona farinosa
Orange-winged parrot, Amazona amazonica
Scaly-naped parrot, Amazona mercenarius
Dusky-billed parrotlet, Forpus modestus
Riparian parrotlet, Forpus crassirostris
Pacific parrotlet, Forpus coelestis
Yellow-faced parrotlet, Forpus xanthops (E)
Cobalt-rumped parrotlet, Forpus xanthopterygius
Black-headed parrot, Pionites melanocephalus
White-bellied parrot, Pionites leucogaster
Red-fan parrot, Deroptyus accipitrinus
Bonaparte's parakeet, Pyrrhura lucianii
Rose-fronted parakeet, Pyrrhura roseifrons
Maroon-tailed parakeet, Pyrrhura melanura
Black-capped parakeet, Pyrrhura rupicola
White-necked parakeet, Pyrrhura albipectus (H)
Peach-fronted parakeet, Eupsittula aurea
Dusky-headed parakeet, Aratinga weddellii
Red-bellied macaw, Orthopsittaca manilatus
Blue-headed macaw, Primolius couloni
Blue-and-yellow macaw, Ara ararauna
Chestnut-fronted macaw, Ara severus
Military macaw, Ara militaris
Scarlet macaw, Ara macao
Red-and-green macaw, Ara chloropterus
Golden-plumed parakeet, Leptosittaca branickii
Red-shouldered macaw, Diopsittaca nobilis
Scarlet-fronted parakeet, Psittacara wagleri
Mitred parakeet, Psittacara mitratus
Red-masked parakeet, Psittacara erythrogenys
White-eyed parakeet, Psittacara leucophthalmus

Antbirds
Order: PasseriformesFamily: Thamnophilidae

The antbirds are a large family of small passerine birds of subtropical and tropical Central and South America. They are forest birds which tend to feed on insects at or near the ground. A sizable minority of them specialize in following columns of army ants to eat small invertebrates that leave their hiding places to flee from the ants. Many species lack bright color, with brown, black, and white being the dominant tones. One hundred sixteen species have been recorded in Peru.

Rufous-rumped antwren, Euchrepomis callinota
Chestnut-shouldered antwren, Euchrepomis humeralis
Yellow-rumped antwren, Euchrepomis sharpei
Ash-winged antwren, Euchrepomis spodioptila (H)
Fasciated antshrike, Cymbilaimus lineatus
Bamboo antshrike, Cymbilaimus sanctaemariae
Undulated antshrike, Frederickena unduliger
Fulvous antshrike, Frederickena fulva
Great antshrike, Taraba major
Black-crested antshrike, Sakesphorus canadensis
Barred antshrike, Thamnophilus doliatus
Rufous-capped antshrike, Thamnophilus ruficapillus
Chapman's antshrike, Thamnophilus zarumae
Lined antshrike, Thamnophilus tenuepunctatus
Chestnut-backed antshrike, Thamnophilus palliatus
Collared antshrike, Thamnophilus bernardi
Black-crowned antshrike, Thamnophilus atrinucha
Plain-winged antshrike, Thamnophilus schistaceus
Mouse-colored antshrike, Thamnophilus murinus
Castelnau's antshrike, Thamnophilus cryptoleucus
Northern slaty-antshrike, Thamnophilus punctatus
Variable antshrike, Thamnophilus caerulescens
Uniform antshrike, Thamnophilus unicolor
White-shouldered antshrike, Thamnophilus aethiops
Upland antshrike, Thamnophilus aroyae
Amazonian antshrike, Thamnophilus amazonicus
Acre antshrike, Thamnophilus divisorius
Pearly antshrike, Megastictus margaritatus
Black bushbird, Neoctantes niger
Rufescent antshrike, Thamnistes rufescens
Plain antvireo, Dysithamnus mentalis
Bicolored antvireo, Dysithamnus occidentalis
White-streaked antvireo, Dysithamnus leucostictus
Ash-throated antwren, Herpsilochmus parkeri (E)
Creamy-bellied antwren, Herpsilochmus motacilloides (E)
Dugand's antwren, Herpsilochmus dugandi
Ancient antwren, Herpsilochmus gentryi
Yellow-breasted antwren, Herpsilochmus axillaris
Rufous-margined antwren, Herpsilochmus frater 
Dusky-throated antshrike, Thamnomanes ardesiacus
Saturnine antshrike, Thamnomanes saturninus
Cinereous antshrike, Thamnomanes caesius
Bluish-slate antshrike, Thamnomanes schistogynus
Plain-throated antwren, Isleria hauxwelli
Spot-winged antshrike, Pygiptila stellaris
Ornate stipplethroat, Epinecrophylla ornata
Rufous-tailed stipplethroat, Epinecrophylla erythrura
White-eyed stipplethroat, Epinecrophylla leucophthalma
Rufous-backed stipplethroat, Epinecrophylla haematonota
Foothill stipplethroat, Epinecrophylla spodionota
Rio Madeira stipplethroat, Epinecrophylla amazonica
Pygmy antwren, Myrmotherula brachyura
Moustached antwren, Myrmotherula ignota
Sclater's antwren, Myrmotherula sclateri
Amazonian streaked-antwren, Myrmotherula multostriata
Cherrie's antwren, Myrmotherula cherriei
Stripe-chested antwren, Myrmotherula longicauda
White-flanked antwren, Myrmotherula axillaris
Slaty antwren, Myrmotherula schisticolor
Rio Suno antwren, Myrmotherula sunensis
Long-winged antwren, Myrmotherula longipennis
Ihering's antwren, Myrmotherula iheringi
Ashy antwren, Myrmotherula grisea
Gray antwren, Myrmotherula menetriesii
Leaden antwren, Myrmotherula assimilis
Banded antbird, Dichrozona cincta
Dot-winged antwren, Microrhopias quixensis
White-fringed antwren, Formicivora grisea
Rusty-backed antwren, Formicivora rufa
Striated antbird, Drymophila devillei
Streak-headed antbird, Drymophila striaticeps
Peruvian warbling-antbird, Hypocnemis peruviana
Yellow-breasted warbling-antbird, Hypocnemis subflava
Yellow-browed antbird, Hypocnemis hypoxantha
Black antbird, Cercomacroides serva
Blackish antbird, Cercomacroides nigrescens
Riparian antbird, Cercomacroides fuscicauda
Manu antbird, Cercomacra manu
Gray antbird, Cercomacra cinerascens
Western fire-eye, Pyriglena maura
White-browed antbird, Myrmoborus leucophrys
Ash-breasted antbird, Myrmoborus lugubris
Black-faced antbird, Myrmoborus myotherinus
Black-tailed antbird, Myrmoborus melanurus
White-lined antbird, Myrmoborus lophotes
Black-chinned antbird, Hypocnemoides melanopogon
Band-tailed antbird, Hypocnemoides maculicauda
Black-and-white antbird, Myrmochanes hemileucus
Silvered antbird, Sclateria naevia
Black-headed antbird, Percnostola rufifrons
Allpahuayo antbird, Percnostola arenarum (E)
Slate-colored antbird, Myrmelastes schistaceus
Plumbeous antbird, Myrmelastes hyperythrus
Spot-winged antbird, Myrmelastes leucostigma
Humaita antbird, Myrmelastes humaythae
Brownish-headed antbird, Myrmelastes brunneiceps
Gray-headed antbird, Ampelornis griseiceps
Chestnut-tailed antbird, Sciaphylax hemimelaena
Zimmer's antbird, Sciaphylax castanea
Cordillera Azul antbird, Myrmoderus eowilsoni (E)
White-shouldered antbird, Akletos melanoceps
Goeldi's antbird, Akletos goeldii
Sooty antbird, Hafferia fortis
Black-throated antbird, Myrmophylax atrothorax
Wing-banded antbird, Myrmornis torquata
White-plumed antbird, Pithys albifrons
White-masked antbird, Pithys castaneus (E)
White-cheeked antbird, Gymnopithys leucaspis
White-throated antbird, Oneillornis salvini
Lunulated antbird, Oneillornis lunulatus
Hairy-crested antbird, Rhegmatorhina melanosticta
Spot-backed antbird, Hylophylax naevius
Dot-backed antbird, Hylophylax punctulatus
Common scale-backed antbird, Willisornis poecilinotus
Black-spotted bare-eye, Phlegopsis nigromaculata
Reddish-winged bare-eye, Phlegopsis erythroptera

Crescentchests
Order: PasseriformesFamily: Melanopareiidae

These are smallish birds which inhabit regions of arid scrub. They have a band across the chest which gives them their name.

Marañon crescentchest, Melanopareia maranonica
Elegant crescentchest, Melanopareia elegans

Gnateaters
Order: PasseriformesFamily: Conopophagidae

The gnateaters are round, short-tailed and long-legged birds, which are closely related to the antbirds. Four species have been recorded in Peru.

Chestnut-belted gnateater, Conopophaga aurita
Ash-throated gnateater, Conopophaga peruviana
Chestnut-crowned gnateater, Conopophaga castaneiceps
Slaty gnateater, Conopophaga ardesiaca

Antpittas
Order: PasseriformesFamily: Grallariidae

Antpittas resemble the true pittas with strong, longish legs, very short tails and stout bills. Thirty-eight species have been recorded in Peru.

Undulated antpitta, Grallaria squamigera
Variegated antpitta, Grallaria varia
Scaled antpitta, Grallaria guatimalensis
Plain-backed antpitta, Grallaria haplonota
Ochre-striped antpitta, Grallaria dignissima
Elusive antpitta, Grallaria eludens
Chestnut-crowned antpitta, Grallaria ruficapilla
Watkins's antpitta, Grallaria watkinsi
Stripe-headed antpitta, Grallaria andicola
Jocotoco antpitta, Grallaria ridgelyi 
Chestnut-naped antpitta, Grallaria nuchalis
Pale-billed antpitta, Grallaria carrikeri (E)
White-throated antpitta, Grallaria albigula
White-bellied antpitta, Grallaria hypoleuca
Rusty-tinged antpitta, Grallaria przewalskii (E)
Bay antpitta, Grallaria capitalis (E)
Red-and-white antpitta, Grallaria erythroleuca (E)
Muisca antpitta, Grallaria rufula
Equatorial antpitta, Grallaria saturata
Cajamarca antpitta, Grallaria cajamarcae (E)
Chestnut antpitta, Grallaria blakei (E)
Urubamba antpitta, Grallaria occabambae (E)
Graves's antpitta, Grallaria gravesi (E)
O'Neill's antpitta, Grallaria oneilli (E)
Junin antpitta, Grallaria obscura (E)
Oxapampa antpitta, Grallaria centralis (E)
Ayacucho antpitta, Grallaria ayacuchensis (E)
Tawny antpitta, Grallaria quitensis
Rufous-faced antpitta, Grallaria erythrotis
Ochre-breasted antpitta, Grallaricula flavirostris
Peruvian antpitta, Grallaricula peruviana
Ochre-fronted antpitta, Grallaricula ochraceifrons (E)
Leymebamba antpitta, Grallaricula leymebambae 
Slate-crowned antpitta, Grallaricula nana
Spotted antpitta, Hylopezus macularius
White-lored antpitta, Myrmothera fulviventris
Amazonian antpitta, Myrmothera berlepschi
Thrush-like antpitta, Myrmothera campanisona

Tapaculos
Order: PasseriformesFamily: Rhinocryptidae

The tapaculos are small suboscine passeriform birds with numerous species in South and Central America. They are terrestrial species that fly only poorly on their short wings. They have strong legs, well-suited to their habitat of grassland or forest undergrowth. The tail is cocked and pointed towards the head. Peru has the largest number of tapaculos of any country; twenty have been recorded there.

Rusty-belted tapaculo, Liosceles thoracicus
Ocellated tapaculo, Acropternis orthonyx
Ash-colored tapaculo, Myornis senilis
Ancash tapaculo, Scytalopus affinis (E)
White-winged tapaculo, Scytalopus krabbei (E)
Loja tapaculo, Scytalopus androstictus
Puna tapaculo, Scytalopus simonsi
Diademed tapaculo, Scytalopus schulenbergi
Vilcabamba tapaculo, Scytalopus urubambae (E)
Ampay tapaculo, Scytalopus whitneyi (E)
Jalca tapaculo, Scytalopus frankeae (E)
Neblina tapaculo, Scytalopus altirostris (E)
Trilling tapaculo, Scytalopus parvirostris
Bolivian tapaculo, Scytalopus bolivianus
White-crowned tapaculo, Scytalopus atratus
Long-tailed tapaculo, Scytalopus micropterus
Rufous-vented tapaculo, Scytalopus femoralis (E)
Utcubamba tapaculo, Scytalopus intermedius (E)
Large-footed tapaculo, Scytalopus macropus (E)
Junin tapaculo, Scytalopus gettyae (E)
Unicolored tapaculo, Scytalopus unicolor (E)
Tschudi's tapaculo, Scytalopus acutirostris (E)
Blackish tapaculo, Scytalopus latrans
Chusquea tapaculo, Scytalopus parkeri

Antthrushes
Order: PasseriformesFamily: Formicariidae

Antthrushes resemble small rails. Seven species have been recorded in Peru.

Rufous-capped antthrush, Formicarius colma
Black-faced antthrush, Formicarius analis
Rufous-fronted antthrush, Formicarius rufifrons
Rufous-breasted antthrush, Formicarius rufipectus
Short-tailed antthrush, Chamaeza campanisona
Striated antthrush, Chamaeza nobilis
Barred antthrush, Chamaeza mollissima

Ovenbirds
Order: PasseriformesFamily: Furnariidae

Ovenbirds comprise a large family of small sub-oscine passerine bird species found in Central and South America. They are a diverse group of insectivores which gets its name from the elaborate "oven-like" clay nests built by some species, although others build stick nests or nest in tunnels or clefts in rock. The woodcreepers are brownish birds which maintain an upright vertical posture, supported by their stiff tail vanes. They feed mainly on insects taken from tree trunks. One hundred fifty-two species have been recorded in Peru.

South American leaftosser, Sclerurus obscurior
Short-billed leaftosser, Sclerurus rufigularis
Black-tailed leaftosser, Sclerurus caudacutus
Gray-throated leaftosser, Sclerurus albigularis
Coastal miner, Geositta peruviana (E)
Slender-billed miner, Geositta tenuirostris
Common miner, Geositta cunicularia
Puna miner, Geositta punensis
Thick-billed miner, Geositta crassirostris (E)
Grayish miner, Geositta maritima
Dark-winged miner, Geositta saxicolina (E)
Spot-throated woodcreeper, Certhiasomus stictolaemus
Olivaceous woodcreeper, Sittasomus griseicapillus
Long-tailed woodcreeper, Deconychura longicauda
Tyrannine woodcreeper, Dendrocincla tyrannina
White-chinned woodcreeper, Dendrocincla merula
Plain-brown woodcreeper, Dendrocincla fuliginosa
Wedge-billed woodcreeper, Glyphorynchus spirurus
Cinnamon-throated woodcreeper, Dendrexetastes rufigula
Long-billed woodcreeper, Nasica longirostris
Amazonian barred-woodcreeper, Dendrocolaptes certhia
Black-banded woodcreeper, Dendrocolaptes picumnus
Bar-bellied woodcreeper, Hylexetastes stresemanni
Strong-billed woodcreeper, Xiphocolaptes promeropirhynchus
Striped woodcreeper, Xiphorhynchus obsoletus
Ocellated woodcreeper, Xiphorhynchus ocellatus
Elegant woodcreeper, Xiphorhynchus elegans
Buff-throated woodcreeper, Xiphorhynchus guttatus
Olive-backed woodcreeper, Xiphorhynchus triangularis
Straight-billed woodcreeper, Dendroplex picus
Zimmer's woodcreeper, Dendroplex kienerii
Red-billed scythebill, Campylorhamphus trochilirostris
Curve-billed scythebill, Campylorhamphus procurvoides
Brown-billed scythebill, Campylorhamphus pusillus
Greater scythebill, Drymotoxeres pucheranii
Streak-headed woodcreeper, Lepidocolaptes souleyetii
Montane woodcreeper, Lepidocolaptes lacrymiger
Duida woodcreeper, Lepidocolaptes duidae
Inambari woodcreeper, Lepidocolaptes fatimalimae
Slender-billed xenops, Xenops tenuirostris
Plain xenops, Xenops minutus
Streaked xenops, Xenops rutilans
Point-tailed palmcreeper, Berlepschia rikeri
Rufous-tailed xenops, Microxenops milleri
Straight-billed earthcreeper, Ochetorhynchus ruficaudus
Streaked tuftedcheek, Pseudocolaptes boissonneautii
Rusty-winged barbtail, Premnornis guttuliger
Pale-legged hornero, Furnarius leucopus
Pale-billed hornero, Furnarius torridus
Lesser hornero, Furnarius minor
Sharp-tailed streamcreeper, Lochmias nematura
Wren-like rushbird, Phleocryptes melanops
Striated earthcreeper, Geocerthia serrana (E)
Scale-throated earthcreeper, Upucerthia dumetaria
White-throated earthcreeper, Upucerthia albigula
Buff-breasted earthcreeper, Upucerthia validirostris
Chestnut-winged cinclodes, Cinclodes albidiventris
Cream-winged cinclodes, Cinclodes albiventris
Royal cinclodes, Cinclodes aricomae
White-bellied cinclodes, Cinclodes palliatus (E)
White-winged cinclodes, Cinclodes atacamensis
Surf cinclodes, Cinclodes taczanowskii (E)
Dusky-cheeked foliage-gleaner, Anabazenops dorsalis
Rufous-rumped foliage-gleaner, Philydor erythrocercum
Cinnamon-rumped foliage-gleaner, Philydor pyrrhodes
Montane foliage-gleaner, Anabacerthia striaticollis
Rufous-tailed foliage-gleaner, Anabacerthia ruficaudata
Buff-browed foliage-gleaner, Syndactyla rufosuperciliata
Lineated foliage-gleaner, Syndactyla subalaris
Rufous-necked foliage-gleaner, Syndactyla ruficollis
Peruvian recurvebill, Syndactyla ucayalae
Bolivian recurvebill, Syndactyla striata
Chestnut-winged hookbill, Ancistrops strigilatus
Buff-fronted foliage-gleaner, Dendroma rufa
Chestnut-winged foliage-gleaner, Dendroma erythroptera
Henna-hooded foliage-gleaner, Clibanornis erythrocephalus
Ruddy foliage-gleaner, Clibanornis rubiginosus
Flammulated treehunter, Thripadectes flammulatus
Rufous-backed treehunter, Thripadectes scrutator
Striped treehunter, Thripadectes holostictus
Black-billed treehunter, Thripadectes melanorhynchus
Chestnut-crowned foliage-gleaner, Automolus rufipileatus
Brown-rumped foliage-gleaner, Automolus melanopezus
Buff-throated foliage-gleaner, Automolus ochrolaemus
Striped woodhaunter, Automolus subulatus
Olive-backed foliage-gleaner, Automolus infuscatus
Spotted barbtail, Premnoplex brunnescens
Pearled treerunner, Margarornis squamiger
Tawny tit-spinetail, Sylviorthorhynchus yanacensis
Plain-mantled tit-spinetail, Leptasthenura aegithaloides
Rusty-crowned tit-spinetail, Leptasthenura pileata (E)
White-browed tit-spinetail, Leptasthenura xenothorax (E)
Streaked tit-spinetail, Leptasthenura striata
Andean tit-spinetail, Leptasthenura andicola
Rufous-fronted thornbird, Phacellodomus rufifrons
Streak-fronted thornbird, Phacellodomus striaticeps
Chestnut-backed thornbird, Phacellodomus dorsalis (E)
White-browed spinetail, Hellmayrea gularis
Creamy-breasted canastero, Asthenes dorbignyi
Line-fronted canastero, Asthenes urubambensis
Many-striped canastero, Asthenes flammulata
Junin canastero, Asthenes virgata (E)
Scribble-tailed canastero, Asthenes maculicauda
Streak-backed canastero, Asthenes wyatti
Puna canastero, Asthenes sclateri
Streak-throated canastero, Asthenes humilis
Cordilleran canastero, Asthenes modesta
Puna thistletail, Asthenes helleri
Ayacucho thistletail, Asthenes ayacuchensis (E)
Vilcabamba thistletail, Asthenes vilcabambae (E)
Canyon canastero, Asthenes pudibunda
Rusty-fronted canastero, Asthenes ottonis (E)
Eye-ringed thistletail, Asthenes palpebralis (E)
White-chinned thistletail, Asthenes fuliginosa
Mouse-colored thistletail, Asthenes griseomurina
Orange-fronted plushcrown, Metopothrix aurantiaca
Equatorial graytail, Xenerpestes singularis
Spectacled prickletail, Siptornis striaticollis
Plain softtail, Thripophaga fusciceps
Russet-mantled softtail, Thripophaga berlepschi (E)
Marcapata spinetail, Cranioleuca marcapatae (E)
Light-crowned spinetail, Cranioleuca albiceps
Rusty-backed spinetail, Cranioleuca vulpina
Parker's spinetail, Cranioleuca vulpecula
Creamy-crested spinetail, Cranioleuca albicapilla (E)
Ash-browed spinetail, Cranioleuca curtata
Line-cheeked spinetail, Cranioleuca antisiensis
Speckled spinetail, Cranioleuca gutturata
Cactus canastero, Pseudasthenes cactorum (E)
Yellow-chinned spinetail, Certhiaxis cinnamomeus
Red-and-white spinetail, Certhiaxis mustelinus
White-bellied spinetail, Mazaria propinqua
Ochre-cheeked spinetail, Synallaxis scutata
Plain-crowned spinetail, Synallaxis gujanensis
Marañon spinetail, Synallaxis maranonica
Great spinetail, Synallaxis hypochondriaca (E)
Necklaced spinetail, Synallaxis stictothorax
Chinchipe spinetail, Synallaxis chichipensis (E)
Russet-bellied spinetail, Synallaxis zimmeri (E)
Slaty spinetail, Synallaxis brachyura
Dusky spinetail, Synallaxis moesta
Cabanis's spinetail, Synallaxis cabanisi
Cinereous-breasted spinetail, Synallaxis hypospodia
Dark-breasted spinetail, Synallaxis albigularis
Pale-breasted spinetail, Synallaxis albescens
Azara's spinetail, Synallaxis azarae
Apurimac spinetail, Synallaxis courseni (E)
Blackish-headed spinetail, Synallaxis tithys
Rufous spinetail, Synallaxis unirufa
Ruddy spinetail, Synallaxis rutilans
Chestnut-throated spinetail, Synallaxis cherriei

Manakins
Order: PasseriformesFamily: Pipridae

The manakins are a family of subtropical and tropical mainland Central and South America, and Trinidad and Tobago. They are compact forest birds, the males typically being brightly colored, although the females of most species are duller and usually green-plumaged. Manakins feed on small fruits, berries and insects. Twenty-four species have been recorded in Peru.

Dwarf tyrant-manakin, Tyranneutes stolzmanni
Saffron-crested tyrant-manakin, Neopelma chrysocephalum
Sulphur-bellied tyrant-manakin, Neopelma sulphureiventer
Jet manakin, Chloropipo unicolor
Blue-backed manakin, Chiroxiphia pareola
Yungas manakin, Chiroxiphia boliviana
Golden-winged manakin, Masius chrysopterus
Black manakin, Xenopipo atronitens
Green manakin, Cryptopipo holochlora
Blue-capped manakin, Lepidothrix coronata
Blue-rumped manakin, Lepidothrix isidorei
Cerulean-capped manakin, Lepidothrix coeruleocapilla (E)
Orange-crowned manakin, Heterocercus aurantiivertex
Flame-crowned manakin, Heterocercus linteatus
White-bearded manakin, Manacus manacus
Wire-tailed manakin, Pipra filicauda
Band-tailed manakin, Pipra fasciicauda
Striolated manakin, Machaeropterus striolatus
Painted manakin, Machaeropterus eckelberryi (E)
Fiery-capped manakin, Machaeropterus pyrocephalus
White-crowned manakin, Pseudopipra pipra
Golden-headed manakin, Ceratopipra erythrocephala
Red-headed manakin, Ceratopipra rubrocapilla
Round-tailed manakin, Ceratopipra chloromeros

Cotingas
Order: PasseriformesFamily: Cotingidae

The cotingas are birds of forests or forest edges in tropical South America. Comparatively little is known about this diverse group, although all have broad bills with hooked tips, rounded wings, and strong legs. The males of many of the species are brightly colored or decorated with plumes or wattles. Thirty species have been recorded in Peru.

Green-and-black fruiteater, Pipreola riefferii
Band-tailed fruiteater, Pipreola intermedia
Barred fruiteater, Pipreola arcuata
Black-chested fruiteater, Pipreola lubomirskii
Masked fruiteater, Pipreola pulchra (E)
Scarlet-breasted fruiteater, Pipreola frontalis
Fiery-throated fruiteater, Pipreola chlorolepidota
Scaled fruiteater, Ampelioides tschudii
White-cheeked cotinga, Zaratornis stresemanni (E)
Peruvian plantcutter, Phytotoma raimondii (E)
Bay-vented cotinga, Doliornis sclateri (E)
Red-crested cotinga, Ampelion rubrocristatus
Chestnut-crested cotinga, Ampelion rufaxilla
Black-necked red-cotinga, Phoenicircus nigricollis
Andean cock-of-the-rock, Rupicola peruviana
Gray-tailed piha, Snowornis subalaris
Olivaceous piha, Snowornis cryptolophus
Purple-throated fruitcrow, Querula purpurata
Red-ruffed fruitcrow, Pyroderus scutatus
Amazonian umbrellabird, Cephalopterus ornatus
Plum-throated cotinga, Cotinga maynana
Purple-breasted cotinga, Cotinga cotinga
Spangled cotinga, Cotinga cayana
Screaming piha, Lipaugus vociferans
Dusky piha, Lipaugus fuscocinereus
Scimitar-winged piha, Lipaugus uropygialis
Purple-throated cotinga, Porphyrolaema porphyrolaema
Pompadour cotinga, Xipholena punicea
Bare-necked fruitcrow, Gymnoderus foetidus
Black-faced cotinga, Conioptilon mcilhennyi

Tityras
Order: PasseriformesFamily: Tityridae

Tityridae are suboscine passerine birds found in forest and woodland in the Neotropics. The species in this family were formerly spread over the families Tyrannidae, Pipridae, and Cotingidae. They are small to medium-sized birds. They do not have the sophisticated vocal capabilities of the songbirds. Most, but not all, have plain coloring. Twenty-two species have been recorded in Peru.

Black-crowned tityra, Tityra inquisitor
Black-tailed tityra, Tityra cayana
Masked tityra, Tityra semifasciata
Varzea schiffornis, Schiffornis major
Northern schiffornis, Schiffornis veraepacis
Foothill schiffornis, Schiffornis aenea
Brown-winged schiffornis, Schiffornis turdina
Cinereous mourner, Laniocera hypopyrra
White-browed purpletuft, Iodopleura isabellae
Shrike-like cotinga, Laniisoma elegans
White-naped xenopsaris, Xenopsaris albinucha (V)
Green-backed becard, Pachyramphus viridis
Barred becard, Pachyramphus versicolor
Slaty becard, Pachyramphus spodiurus
Cinereous becard, Pachyramphus rufus
Chestnut-crowned becard, Pachyramphus castaneus
White-winged becard, Pachyramphus polychopterus
Black-and-white becard, Pachyramphus albogriseus
Black-capped becard, Pachyramphus marginatus
One-colored becard, Pachyramphus homochrous
Pink-throated becard, Pachyramphus minor
Crested becard, Pachyramphus validus

Sharpbill
Order: PasseriformesFamily: Oxyruncidae

The sharpbill is a small bird of dense forests in Central and South America. It feeds mostly on fruit but also eats insects.

Sharpbill, Oxyruncus cristatus

Royal flycatchers
Order: PasseriformesFamily: Onychorhynchidae

In 2019 the SACC determined that these five species, which were formerly considered tyrant flycatchers, belonged in their own family.

Royal flycatcher, Onychorhynchus coronatus
Ruddy-tailed flycatcher, Terenotriccus erythrurus
Tawny-breasted flycatcher, Myiobius villosus
Sulphur-rumped flycatcher, Myiobius barbatus
Black-tailed flycatcher, Myiobius atricaudus

Tyrant flycatchers
Order: PasseriformesFamily: Tyrannidae

Tyrant flycatchers are passerine birds which occur throughout North and South America. They superficially resemble the Old World flycatchers, but are more robust and have stronger bills. They do not have the sophisticated vocal capabilities of the songbirds. Most, but not all, have plain coloring. As the name implies, most are insectivorous. Peru has the largest number of tyrant flycatchers of any country and it is indeed the largest assemblage of a family in any country on earth. Two hundred forty-nine have been recorded there.

Wing-barred piprites, Piprites chloris
Cinnamon manakin-tyrant, Neopipo cinnamomea
Cinnamon-crested spadebill, Platyrinchus saturatus
White-throated spadebill, Platyrinchus mystaceus
Golden-crowned spadebill, Platyrinchus coronatus
Yellow-throated spadebill, Platyrinchus flavigularis
White-crested spadebill, Platyrinchus platyrhynchos
Bronze-olive pygmy-tyrant, Pseudotriccus pelzelni
Hazel-fronted pygmy-tyrant, Pseudotriccus simplex
Rufous-headed pygmy-tyrant, Pseudotriccus ruficeps
Ringed antpipit, Corythopis torquatus
Variegated bristle-tyrant, Phylloscartes poecilotis
Marble-faced bristle-tyrant, Phylloscartes ophthalmicus
Spectacled bristle-tyrant, Phylloscartes orbitalis
Mottle-cheeked tyrannulet, Phylloscartes ventralis
Ecuadorian tyrannulet, Phylloscartes gualaquizae
Rufous-browed tyrannulet, Phylloscartes superciliaris (H)
Cinnamon-faced tyrannulet, Phylloscartes parkeri
Streak-necked flycatcher, Mionectes striaticollis
Olive-striped flycatcher, Mionectes olivaceus
Ochre-bellied flycatcher, Mionectes oleagineus
McConnell's flycatcher, Mionectes macconnelli
Sepia-capped flycatcher, Leptopogon amaurocephalus
Slaty-capped flycatcher, Leptopogon superciliaris
Rufous-breasted flycatcher, Leptopogon rufipectus
Inca flycatcher, Leptopogon taczanowskii (E)
Brownish twistwing, Cnipodectes subbrunneus
Rufous twistwing, Cnipodectes superrufus
Olivaceous flatbill, Rhynchocyclus olivaceus
Fulvous-breasted flatbill, Rhynchocyclus fulvipectus
Yellow-olive flycatcher, Tolmomyias sulphurescens
Orange-eyed flycatcher, Tolmomyias traylori
Yellow-margined flycatcher, Tolmomyias assimilis
Gray-crowned flycatcher, Tolmomyias poliocephalus
Yellow-breasted flycatcher, Tolmomyias flaviventris
White-bellied pygmy-tyrant, Myiornis albiventris
Short-tailed pygmy-tyrant, Myiornis ecaudatus
Scale-crested pygmy-tyrant, Lophotriccus pileatus
Double-banded pygmy-tyrant, Lophotriccus vitiosus
Long-crested pygmy-tyrant, Lophotriccus eulophotes
Helmeted pygmy-tyrant, Lophotriccus galeatus
Snethlage's tody-tyrant, Hemitriccus minor (H)
Acre tody-tyrant, Hemitriccus cohnhafti
Yungas tody-tyrant, Hemitriccus spodiops
Flammulated pygmy-tyrant, Hemitriccus flammulatus
White-eyed tody-tyrant, Hemitriccus zosterops
White-bellied tody-tyrant, Hemitriccus griseipectus
Johannes's tody-tyrant, Hemitriccus iohannis
Stripe-necked tody-tyrant, Hemitriccus striaticollis
Pearly-vented tody-tyrant, Hemitriccus margaritaceiventer
Zimmer's tody-tyrant, Hemitriccus minimus
Black-throated tody-tyrant, Hemitriccus granadensis
Cinnamon-breasted tody-tyrant, Hemitriccus cinnamomeipectus
Buff-throated tody-tyrant, Hemitriccus rufigularis
Rufous-crowned tody-flycatcher, Poecilotriccus ruficeps
Johnson's tody-flycatcher, Poecilotriccus luluae (E)
White-cheeked tody-flycatcher, Poecilotriccus albifacies
Black-and-white tody-flycatcher, Poecilotriccus capitalis
Ochre-faced tody-flycatcher, Poecilotriccus plumbeiceps
Rusty-fronted tody-flycatcher, Poecilotriccus latirostris
Golden-winged tody-flycatcher, Poecilotriccus calopterus
Black-backed tody-flycatcher, Poecilotriccus pulchellus (E)
Spotted tody-flycatcher, Todirostrum maculatum
Common tody-flycatcher, Todirostrum cinereum
Yellow-browed tody-flycatcher, Todirostrum chrysocrotaphum
Ornate flycatcher, Myiotriccus ornatus
Handsome flycatcher, Nephelomyias pulcher
Orange-banded flycatcher, Nephelomyias lintoni
Ochraceous-breasted flycatcher, Nephelomyias ochraceiventris
Cliff flycatcher, Hirundinea ferruginea
Cinnamon flycatcher, Pyrrhomyias cinnamomeus
Bolivian tyrannulet, Zimmerius bolivianus
Red-billed tyrannulet, Zimmerius cinereicapilla
Mishana tyrannulet, Zimmerius villarejoi (E)
Slender-footed tyrannulet, Zimmerius gracilipes
Golden-faced tyrannulet, Zimmerius chrysops
Peruvian tyrannulet, Zimmerius viridiflavus
Lesser wagtail-tyrant, Stigmatura napensis
Plain tyrannulet, Inezia inornata
Fulvous-crowned scrub-tyrant, Euscarthmus meloryphus
Fulvous-faced scrub-tyrant, Euscarthmus fulviceps 
White-lored tyrannulet, Ornithion inerme
Southern beardless-tyrannulet, Camptostoma obsoletum
Yellow-bellied elaenia, Elaenia flavogaster
Large elaenia, Elaenia spectabilis
White-crested elaenia, Elaenia albiceps
Small-billed elaenia, Elaenia parvirostris
Slaty elaenia, Elaenia strepera
Mottle-backed elaenia, Elaenia gigas
Brownish elaenia, Elaenia pelzelni
Plain-crested elaenia, Elaenia cristata
Lesser elaenia, Elaenia chiriquensis
Highland elaenia, Elaenia obscura
Sierran elaenia, Elaenia pallatangae
Yellow-crowned tyrannulet, Tyrannulus elatus
Forest elaenia, Myiopagis gaimardii
Gray elaenia, Myiopagis caniceps
Foothill elaenia, Myiopagis olallai
Pacific elaenia, Myiopagis subplacens
Yellow-crowned elaenia, Myiopagis flavivertex
Greenish elaenia, Myiopagis viridicata
Yellow tyrannulet, Capsiempis flaveola
Rough-legged tyrannulet, Phyllomyias burmeisteri
Sclater's tyrannulet, Phyllomyias sclateri
Yungas tyrannulet, Phyllomyias weedeni
Sooty-headed tyrannulet, Phyllomyias griseiceps
Black-capped tyrannulet, Phyllomyias nigrocapillus
Ashy-headed tyrannulet, Phyllomyias cinereiceps
Tawny-rumped tyrannulet, Phyllomyias uropygialis
Plumbeous-crowned tyrannulet, Phyllomyias plumbeiceps
Mouse-colored tyrannulet, Phaeomyias murina
Gray-and-white tyrannulet, Pseudelaenia leucospodia
White-tailed tyrannulet, Mecocerculus poecilocercus
Buff-banded tyrannulet, Mecocerculus hellmayri
White-banded tyrannulet, Mecocerculus stictopterus
White-throated tyrannulet, Mecocerculus leucophrys
Rufous-winged tyrannulet, Mecocerculus calopterus
Sulphur-bellied tyrannulet, Mecocerculus minor
Black-crested tit-tyrant, Anairetes nigrocristatus
Pied-crested tit-tyrant, Anairetes reguloides
Ash-breasted tit-tyrant, Anairetes alpinus
Yellow-billed tit-tyrant, Anairetes flavirostris
Tufted tit-tyrant, Anairetes parulus
Subtropical doradito, Pseudocolopteryx acutipennis
Torrent tyrannulet, Serpophaga cinerea
River tyrannulet, Serpophaga hypoleuca
Unstreaked tit-tyrant, Uromyias agraphia (E)
Short-tailed field tyrant, Muscigralla brevicauda
Cinnamon attila, Attila cinnamomeus
Ochraceous attila, Attila torridus
Citron-bellied attila, Attila citriniventris
Dull-capped attila, Attila bolivianus
Bright-rumped attila, Attila spadiceus
Piratic flycatcher, Legatus leucophaius
Large-headed flatbill, Ramphotrigon megacephalum
Rufous-tailed flatbill, Ramphotrigon ruficauda
Dusky-tailed flatbill, Ramphotrigon fuscicauda
Great kiskadee, Pitangus sulphuratus
Lesser kiskadee, Philohydor lictor
Sulphury flycatcher, Tyrannopsis sulphurea
Boat-billed flycatcher, Megarynchus pitangua
Golden-crowned flycatcher, Myiodynastes chrysocephalus
Baird's flycatcher, Myiodynastes bairdii
Sulphur-bellied flycatcher, Myiodynastes luteiventris
Streaked flycatcher, Myiodynastes maculatus
Rusty-margined flycatcher, Myiozetetes cayanensis
Social flycatcher, Myiozetetes similis
Gray-capped flycatcher, Myiozetetes granadensis
Dusky-chested flycatcher, Myiozetetes luteiventris
Yellow-throated flycatcher, Conopias parvus
Three-striped flycatcher, Conopias trivirgatus
Lemon-browed flycatcher, Conopias cinchoneti
Variegated flycatcher, Empidonomus varius
Crowned slaty flycatcher, Empidonomus aurantioatrocristatus
Snowy-throated kingbird, Tyrannus niveigularis
White-throated kingbird, Tyrannus albogularis
Tropical kingbird, Tyrannus melancholicus
Fork-tailed flycatcher, Tyrannus savana
Eastern kingbird, Tyrannus tyrannus
Grayish mourner, Rhytipterna simplex
Rufous casiornis, Casiornis rufus
White-rumped sirystes, Sirystes albocinereus
Rufous flycatcher, Myiarchus semirufus (E)
Dusky-capped flycatcher, Myiarchus tuberculifer
Swainson's flycatcher, Myiarchus swainsoni
Short-crested flycatcher, Myiarchus ferox
Sooty-crowned flycatcher, Myiarchus phaeocephalus
Pale-edged flycatcher, Myiarchus cephalotes
Great crested flycatcher, Myiarchus crinitus (V)
Brown-crested flycatcher, Myiarchus tyrannulus
Long-tailed tyrant, Colonia colonus
Flavescent flycatcher, Myiophobus flavicans
Orange-crested flycatcher, Myiophobus phoenicomitra
Unadorned flycatcher, Myiophobus inornatus
Roraiman flycatcher, Myiophobus roraimae
Olive-chested flycatcher, Myiophobus cryptoxanthus
Bran-colored flycatcher, Myiophobus fasciatus
Crowned chat-tyrant, Ochthoeca frontalis
Jelski's chat-tyrant, Ochthoeca jelskii
Golden-browed chat-tyrant, Ochthoeca pulchella
Yellow-bellied chat-tyrant, Ochthoeca diadema
Slaty-backed chat-tyrant, Ochthoeca cinnamomeiventris
Rufous-breasted chat-tyrant, Ochthoeca rufipectoralis
Brown-backed chat-tyrant, Ochthoeca fumicolor
d'Orbigny's chat-tyrant, Ochthoeca oenanthoides
Piura chat-tyrant, Ochthoeca piurae (E)
White-browed chat-tyrant, Ochthoeca leucophrys
Tumbes tyrant, Tumbezia salvini 
Amazonian scrub-flycatcher, Sublegatus obscurior
Southern scrub-flycatcher, Sublegatus modestus
Vermilion flycatcher, Pyrocephalus rubinus
Pied water-tyrant, Fluvicola pica
Black-backed water-tyrant, Fluvicola albiventer
Masked water-tyrant, Fluvicola nengeta
White-headed marsh tyrant, Arundinicola leucocephala
Andean negrito, Lessonia oreas
Spectacled tyrant, Hymenops perspicillatus (V)
Riverside tyrant, Knipolegus orenocensis
Rufous-tailed tyrant, Knipolegus poecilurus
Amazonian black-tyrant, Knipolegus poecilocercus
Jelski's black-tyrant, Knipolegus signatus
Plumbeous black-tyrant, Knipolegus cabanisi
White-winged black-tyrant, Knipolegus aterrimus
Hudson's black-tyrant, Knipolegus hudsoni (V)
Yellow-browed tyrant, Satrapa icterophrys
Little ground-tyrant, Muscisaxicola fluviatilis
Spot-billed ground-tyrant, Muscisaxicola maculirostris
Taczanowski's ground-tyrant, Muscisaxicola griseus
Puna ground-tyrant, Muscisaxicola juninensis
Cinereous ground-tyrant, Muscisaxicola cinereus
White-fronted ground-tyrant, Muscisaxicola albifrons
Ochre-naped ground-tyrant, Muscisaxicola flavinucha
Rufous-naped ground-tyrant, Muscisaxicola rufivertex
Dark-faced ground-tyrant, Muscisaxicola maclovianus
White-browed ground-tyrant, Muscisaxicola albilora
Plain-capped ground-tyrant, Muscisaxicola alpinus (H)
Cinnamon-bellied ground-tyrant, Muscisaxicola capistratus
Black-fronted ground-tyrant, Muscisaxicola frontalis
Red-rumped bush-tyrant, Cnemarchus erythropygius
Rufous-webbed bush-tyrant, Cnemarchus rufipennis
Gray monjita, Nengetus cinereus
Black-billed shrike-tyrant, Agriornis montanus
White-tailed shrike-tyrant, Agriornis albicauda
Gray-bellied shrike-tyrant, Agriornis micropterus
Streak-throated bush-tyrant, Myiotheretes striaticollis
Smoky bush-tyrant, Myiotheretes fumigatus
Rufous-bellied bush-tyrant, Myiotheretes fuscorufus
Drab water tyrant, Ochthornis littoralis
Fuscous flycatcher, Cnemotriccus fuscatus
Euler's flycatcher, Lathrotriccus euleri
Gray-breasted flycatcher, Lathrotriccus griseipectus
Olive flycatcher, Mitrephanes olivaceus
Black phoebe, Sayornis nigricans
Alder flycatcher, Empidonax alnorum
Olive-sided flycatcher, Contopus cooperi
Smoke-colored pewee, Contopus fumigatus
Western wood-pewee, Contopus sordidulus
Eastern wood-pewee, Contopus virens
Tropical pewee, Contopus cinereus
Blackish pewee, Contopus nigrescens
Many-colored rush tyrant, Tachuris rubrigastra

Vireos
Order: PasseriformesFamily: Vireonidae

The vireos are a group of small to medium-sized passerine birds. They are typically greenish in color and resemble wood warblers apart from their heavier bills. Fourteen species have been recorded in Peru.

Rufous-browed peppershrike, Cyclarhis gujanensis
Olivaceous greenlet, Hylophilus olivaceus
Ashy-headed greenlet, Hylophilus pectoralis
Gray-chested greenlet, Hylophilus semicinereus
Lemon-chested greenlet, Hylophilus thoracicus
Slaty-capped shrike-vireo, Vireolanius leucotis
Tawny-crowned greenlet, Tunchiornis ochraceiceps
Lesser greenlet, Pachysylvia decurtata
Dusky-capped greenlet, Pachysylvia hypoxantha
Brown-capped vireo, Vireo leucophrys
Red-eyed vireo, Vireo olivaceus
Chivi vireo, Vireo chivi
Yellow-green vireo, Vireo flavoviridis
Black-whiskered vireo, Vireo altiloquus (V)

Jays
Order: PasseriformesFamily: Corvidae

The family Corvidae includes crows, ravens, jays, choughs, magpies, treepies, nutcrackers, and ground jays. Corvids are above average in size among the Passeriformes, and some of the larger species show high levels of intelligence. Six species have been recorded in Peru.

White-collared jay, Cyanolyca viridicyana
Turquoise jay, Cyanolyca turcosa
Violaceous jay, Cyanocorax violaceus
Purplish jay, Cyanocorax cyanomelas
White-tailed jay, Cyanocorax mystacalis
Green jay, Cyanocorax yncas

Swallows
Order: PasseriformesFamily: Hirundinidae

The family Hirundinidae is adapted to aerial feeding. They have a slender streamlined body, long pointed wings, and a short bill with a wide gape. The feet are adapted to perching rather than walking, and the front toes are partially joined at the base. Twenty-one species have been recorded in Peru.

Blue-and-white swallow, Pygochelidon cyanoleuca
Tawny-headed swallow, Alopochelidon fucata (V)
Brown-bellied swallow, Orochelidon murina
Pale-footed swallow, Orochelidon flavipes
Andean swallow, Orochelidon andecola
White-banded swallow, Atticora fasciata
White-thighed swallow, Atticora tibialis
Southern rough-winged swallow, Stelgidopteryx ruficollis
Brown-chested martin, Progne tapera
Purple martin, Progne subis
Gray-breasted martin, Progne chalybea
Southern martin, Progne elegans
Peruvian martin, Progne murphyi
Tumbes swallow, Tachycineta stolzmanni
White-winged swallow, Tachycineta albiventer
White-rumped swallow, Tachycineta leucorrhoa
Chilean swallow, Tachycineta leucopyga (H)
Bank swallow, Riparia riparia
Barn swallow, Hirundo rustica
Cliff swallow, Petrochelidon pyrrhonota
Chestnut-collared swallow, Petrochelidon rufocollaris

Wrens
Order: PasseriformesFamily: Troglodytidae

The wrens are mainly small and inconspicuous except for their loud songs. These birds have short wings and thin down-turned bills. Several species often hold their tails upright. All are insectivorous. Twenty-four species have been recorded in Peru.

Scaly-breasted wren, Microcerculus marginatus
Wing-banded wren, Microcerculus bambla
Gray-mantled wren, Odontorchilus branickii
House wren, Troglodytes aedon
Mountain wren, Troglodytes solstitialis
Grass wren, Cistothorus platensis
Fasciated wren, Campylorhynchus fasciatus
Thrush-like wren, Campylorhynchus turdinus
Plain-tailed wren, Pheugopedius euophrys
Inca wren, Pheugopedius eisenmanni (E)
Moustached wren, Pheugopedius genibarbis
Coraya wren, Pheugopedius coraya
Speckle-breasted wren, Pheugopedius sclateri
Superciliated wren, Cantorchilus superciliaris
Buff-breasted wren, Cantorchilus leucotis
Rufous wren, Cinnycerthia unirufa
Sharpe's wren, Cinnycerthia olivascens
Peruvian wren, Cinnycerthia peruana (E)
Fulvous wren, Cinnycerthia fulva
White-breasted wood-wren, Henicorhina leucosticta
Bar-winged wood-wren, Henicorhina leucoptera
Gray-breasted wood-wren, Henicorhina leucophrys
Chestnut-breasted wren, Cyphorhinus thoracicus
Musician wren, Cyphorhinus aradus

Gnatcatchers
Order: PasseriformesFamily: Polioptilidae

These dainty birds resemble Old World warblers in their build and habits, moving restlessly through the foliage seeking insects. The gnatcatchers and gnatwrens are mainly soft bluish gray in color and have the typical insectivore's long sharp bill. They are birds of fairly open woodland or scrub, which nest in bushes or trees. Six species have been recorded in Peru.

Collared gnatwren, Microbates collaris
Half-collared gnatwren, Microbates cinereiventris
Trilling gnatwren, Ramphocaenus melanurus
Chattering gnatwren, Ramphocaenus sticturus
Tropical gnatcatcher, Polioptila plumbea
Iquitos gnatcatcher, Polioptila clementsi (E)

Donacobius
Order: PasseriformesFamily: Donacobiidae

The black-capped donacobius is found in wet habitats from Panama across northern South America and east of the Andes to Argentina and Paraguay.

Black-capped donacobius, Donacobius atricapilla

Dippers
Order: PasseriformesFamily: Cinclidae

Dippers are a group of perching birds whose habitat includes aquatic environments in the Americas, Europe and Asia. They are named for their bobbing or dipping movements. One species has been recorded in Peru.

White-capped dipper, Cinclus leucocephalus

Thrushes
Order: PasseriformesFamily: Turdidae

The thrushes are a group of passerine birds that occur mainly in the Old World. They are plump, soft plumaged, small to medium-sized insectivores or sometimes omnivores, often feeding on the ground. Many have attractive songs. Twenty-five species have been recorded in Peru.

Andean solitaire, Myadestes ralloides
Slaty-backed nightingale-thrush, Catharus fuscater
Speckled nightingale-thrush, Catharus maculatus
Veery, Catharus fuscescens (V)
Gray-cheeked thrush, Catharus minimus
Swainson's thrush, Catharus ustulatus
White-eared solitaire, Entomodestes leucotis
Rufous-brown solitaire, Cichlopsis leucogenys
Pale-eyed thrush, Turdus leucops
Plumbeous-backed thrush, Turdus reevei
Pale-breasted thrush, Turdus leucomelas
Hauxwell's thrush, Turdus hauxwelli
Pale-vented thrush, Turdus obsoletus (H)
Ecuadorian thrush, Turdus maculirostris
Varzea thrush, Turdus sanchezorum
Lawrence's thrush, Turdus lawrencii
Creamy-bellied thrush, Turdus amaurochalinus
Black-billed thrush, Turdus ignobilis
Marañon thrush, Turdus maranonicus
Chestnut-bellied thrush, Turdus fulviventris
Andean slaty thrush, Turdus nigriceps
Great thrush, Turdus fuscater
Chiguanco thrush, Turdus chiguanco
Glossy-black thrush, Turdus serranus
White-necked thrush, Turdus albicollis

Mockingbirds
Order: PasseriformesFamily: Mimidae

The mimids are a family of passerine birds that includes thrashers, mockingbirds, tremblers, and the New World catbirds. These birds are notable for their vocalizations, especially their ability to mimic a wide variety of birds and other sounds heard outdoors. Their coloring tends towards dull-grays and browns. Four species have been recorded in Peru.

Tropical mockingbird, Mimus gilvus (V)
Long-tailed mockingbird, Mimus longicaudatus
White-banded mockingbird, Mimus triurus (V)
Brown-backed mockingbird, Mimus dorsalis (V)

Old World sparrows
Order: PasseriformesFamily: Passeridae

Sparrows are small passerine birds. In general, sparrows tend to be small, plump, brown or gray birds with short tails and short powerful beaks. Sparrows are seed eaters, but they also consume small insects. One species has been recorded in Peru.

House sparrow, Passer domesticus (I)

Pipits and wagtails
Order: PasseriformesFamily: Motacillidae

Motacillidae is a family of small passerine birds with medium to long tails. They include the wagtails, longclaws, and pipits. They are slender ground-feeding insectivores of open country. Six species have been recorded in Peru.

Yellowish pipit, Anthus chii
Short-billed pipit, Anthus furcatus
Peruvian pipit, Anthus peruvianus
Correndera pipit, Anthus correndera
Hellmayr's pipit, Anthus hellmayri
Paramo pipit, Anthus bogotensis

Finches
Order: PasseriformesFamily: Fringillidae

Finches are seed-eating passerine birds, that are small to moderately large and have a strong beak, usually conical and in some species very large. All have twelve tail feathers and nine primaries. These birds have a bouncing flight with alternating bouts of flapping and gliding on closed wings, and most sing well. Twenty species have been recorded in Peru.

Thick-billed siskin, Spinus crassirostris
Hooded siskin, Spinus magellanicus
Saffron siskin, Spinus siemiradzkii
Olivaceous siskin, Spinus olivaceus
Yellow-bellied siskin, Spinus xanthogastrus
Black siskin, Spinus atratus
Yellow-rumped siskin, Spinus uropygialis
Lesser goldfinch, Spinus psaltria
Golden-rumped euphonia, Chlorophonia cyanocephala
Blue-naped chlorophonia, Chlorophonia cyanea
Chestnut-breasted chlorophonia, Chlorophonia pyrrhophrys
Orange-crowned euphonia, Euphonia saturata
Plumbeous euphonia, Euphonia plumbea
Purple-throated euphonia, Euphonia chlorotica
Golden-bellied euphonia, Euphonia chrysopasta
White-vented euphonia, Euphonia minuta
Orange-bellied euphonia, Euphonia xanthogaster
Thick-billed euphonia, Euphonia laniirostris
Bronze-green euphonia, Euphonia mesochrysa
Rufous-bellied euphonia, Euphonia rufiventris

Sparrows
Order: PasseriformesFamily: Passerellidae

Most of the species are known as sparrows, but these birds are not closely related to the Old World sparrows which are in the family Passeridae. Many of these have distinctive head patterns. Thirty species have been recorded in Peru.

Yellow-throated chlorospingus, Chlorospingus flavigularis
Short-billed chlorospingus, Chlorospingus parvirostris
Ashy-throated chlorospingus, Chlorospingus canigularis
Common chlorospingus, Chlorospingus flavopectus
Tumbes sparrow, Aimophila stolzmanni
Grassland sparrow, Ammodramus humeralis
Yellow-browed sparrow, Ammodramus aurifrons
Black-striped sparrow, Arremonops conirostris (H)
Gray-browed brushfinch, Arremon assimilis
White-browed brushfinch, Arremon torquatus
Orange-billed sparrow, Arremon aurantiirostris
Black-capped sparrow, Arremon abeillei
Pectoral sparrow, Arremon taciturnus
Chestnut-capped brushfinch, Arremon brunneinucha
Olive finch, Arremon castaneiceps
Rufous-collared sparrow, Zonotrichia capensis
White-headed brushfinch, Atlapetes albiceps
Rufous-eared brushfinch, Atlapetes rufigenis (E)
Tricolored brushfinch, Atlapetes tricolor
Slaty brushfinch, Atlapetes schistaceus
Pale-naped brushfinch, Atlapetes pallidinucha
Yellow-breasted brushfinch, Atlapetes latinuchus
White-winged brushfinch, Atlapetes leucopterus
Bay-crowned brushfinch, Atlapetes seebohmi
Rusty-bellied brushfinch, Atlapetes nationi (E)
Apurimac brushfinch, Atlapetes forbesi (E)
Black-spectacled brushfinch, Atlapetes melanopsis (E)
Vilcabamba brushfinch, Atlapetes terborghi (E)
Cuzco brushfinch, Atlapetes canigenis (E)
Black-faced brushfinch, Atlapetes melanolaemus

Blackbirds
Order: PasseriformesFamily: Icteridae

The icterids are a group of small to medium-sized, often colorful, passerine birds restricted to the New World and include the grackles, New World blackbirds and New World orioles. Most species have black as the predominant plumage color, often enlivened by yellow, orange, or red. Thirty-four species have been recorded in Peru.

Bobolink, Dolichonyx oryzivorus
Red-breasted meadowlark, Leistes militaris
White-browed meadowlark, Leistes superciliaris
Peruvian meadowlark, Leistes bellicosa
Yellow-billed cacique, Amblycercus holosericeus
Russet-backed oropendola, Psarocolius angustifrons
Dusky-green oropendola, Psarocolius atrovirens
Green oropendola, Psarocolius viridis
Crested oropendola, Psarocolius decumanus
Olive oropendola, Psarocolius bifasciatus
Solitary black cacique, Cacicus solitarius
Ecuadorian cacique, Cacicus sclateri
Selva cacique, Cacicus koepckeae (E)
Scarlet-rumped cacique, Cacicus uropygialis
Yellow-rumped cacique, Cacicus cela
Mountain cacique, Cacicus chrysonotus
Band-tailed cacique, Cacicus latirostris
Red-rumped cacique, Cacicus haemorrhous
Casqued cacique, Cacicus oseryi
Orange-backed troupial, Icterus croconotus
White-edged oriole, Icterus graceannae
Yellow-tailed oriole, Icterus mesomelas
Epaulet oriole, Icterus cayanensis
Giant cowbird, Molothrus oryzivorus
Shiny cowbird, Molothrus bonariensis
Scrub blackbird, Dives warczewiczi
Great-tailed grackle, Quiscalus mexicanus
Velvet-fronted grackle, Lampropsar tanagrinus
Oriole blackbird, Gymnomystax mexicanus
Chopi blackbird, Gnorimopsar chopi
Pale-eyed blackbird, Agelasticus xanthophthalmus
Unicolored blackbird, Agelasticus cyanopus (V)
Yellow-winged blackbird, Agelasticus thilius
Yellow-hooded blackbird, Chrysomus icterocephalus

Wood-warblers
Order: PasseriformesFamily: Parulidae

The wood-warblers are a group of small, often colorful, passerine birds restricted to the New World. Most are arboreal, but some are terrestrial. Most members of this family are insectivores. Twenty-six species have been recorded in Peru.

Northern waterthrush, Parkesia noveboracensis
Golden-winged warbler, Vermivora chrysoptera (H)
Black-and-white warbler, Mniotilta varia (V)
Tennessee warbler, Leiothlypis peregrina (V)
Connecticut warbler, Oporornis agilis
Masked yellowthroat, Geothlypis aequinoctialis
American redstart, Setophaga ruticilla
Cerulean warbler, Setophaga cerulea
Tropical parula, Setophaga pitiayumi
Blackburnian warbler, Setophaga fusca
Yellow warbler, Setophaga petechia
Blackpoll warbler, Setophaga striata
Palm warbler, Setophaga palmarum (V)
Citrine warbler, Myiothlypis luteoviridis
Black-crested warbler, Myiothlypis nigrocristata
Pale-legged warbler, Myiothlypis signata
Buff-rumped warbler, Myiothlypis fulvicauda
Two-banded warbler, Myiothlypis bivittata
Golden-bellied warbler, Myiothlypis chrysogaster
Gray-and-gold warbler, Myiothlypis fraseri
Russet-crowned warbler, Myiothlypis coronata
Three-striped warbler, Basileuterus tristriatus
Three-banded warbler, Basileuterus trifasciatus
Canada warbler, Cardellina canadensis
Slate-throated redstart, Myioborus miniatus
Spectacled redstart, Myioborus melanocephalus

Mitrospingids
Order: PasseriformesFamily: Mitrospingidae

Until 2017 the four species in this family were included in the family Thraupidae, the "true" tanagers.

Red-billed pied tanager, Lamprospiza melanoleuca

Cardinal grosbeaks
Order: PasseriformesFamily: Cardinalidae

The cardinals are a family of robust, seed-eating birds with strong bills. They are typically associated with open woodland. The sexes usually have distinct plumages. Thirteen species have been recorded in Peru.

Hepatic tanager, Piranga flava
Summer tanager, Piranga rubra
Scarlet tanager, Piranga olivacea
Red-hooded tanager, Piranga rubriceps
White-winged tanager, Piranga leucoptera
Red-crowned ant-tanager, Habia rubica
Carmiol's tanager, Chlorothraupis carmioli
Golden grosbeak, Pheucticus chrysogaster
Black-backed grosbeak, Pheucticus aureoventris
Rose-breasted grosbeak, Pheucticus ludovicianus (V)
Blue seedeater, Amaurospiza concolor
Blue-black grosbeak, Cyanoloxia cyanoides
Amazonian grosbeak, Cyanoloxia rothschildii

Tanagers
Order: PasseriformesFamily: Thraupidae

The tanagers are a large group of small to medium-sized passerine birds restricted to the New World, mainly in the tropics. Many species are brightly colored. As a family they are omnivorous, but individual species specialize in eating fruits, seeds, insects, or other types of food. Most have short, rounded wings. One hundred eighty-nine species have been recorded in Peru.

Hooded tanager, Nemosia pileata
White-capped tanager, Sericossypha albocristata
Yellow-shouldered grosbeak, Parkerthraustes humeralis
Plushcap, Catamblyrhynchus diadema
Green honeycreeper, Chlorophanes spiza
Golden-collared honeycreeper, Iridophanes pulcherrimus
Guira tanager, Hemithraupis guira
Yellow-backed tanager, Hemithraupis flavicollis
Bicolored conebill, Conirostrum bicolor
Pearly-breasted conebill, Conirostrum margaritae
Chestnut-vented conebill, Conirostrum speciosum
Giant conebill, Conirostrum binghami
White-browed conebill, Conirostrum ferrugineiventre
Blue-backed conebill, Conirostrum sitticolor
Capped conebill, Conirostrum albifrons
Tamarugo conebill, Conirostrum tamarugense
Cinereous conebill, Conirostrum cinereum
Stripe-tailed yellow-finch, Sicalis citrina
Puna yellow-finch, Sicalis lutea
Bright-rumped yellow-finch, Sicalis uropygialis
Greenish yellow-finch, Sicalis olivascens
Saffron finch, Sicalis flaveola
Grassland yellow-finch, Sicalis luteola
Raimondi's yellow-finch, Sicalis raimondii
Sulphur-throated finch, Sicalis taczanowskii
Black-hooded sierra finch, Phrygilus atriceps
Peruvian sierra finch, Phrygilus punensis
Plumbeous sierra finch, Geospizopsis unicolor
Ash-breasted sierra finch, Geospizopsis plebejus
Mourning sierra finch, Rhopospina fruticeti
Band-tailed sierra finch, Rhopospina alaudina
White-throated sierra finch, Idiopsar erythronotus
Glacier finch, Idiopsar speculifer
Boulder finch, Idiopsar brachyurus
Band-tailed seedeater, Catamenia analis
Plain-colored seedeater, Catamenia inornata
Paramo seedeater, Catamenia homochroa
Glossy flowerpiercer, Diglossa lafresnayii
Moustached flowerpiercer, Diglossa mystacalis
Black flowerpiercer, Diglossa humeralis
Black-throated flowerpiercer, Diglossa brunneiventris
White-sided flowerpiercer, Diglossa albilatera
Rusty flowerpiercer, Diglossa sittoides
Deep-blue flowerpiercer, Diglossa glauca
Bluish flowerpiercer, Diglossa caerulescens
Masked flowerpiercer, Diglossa cyanea
Tit-like dacnis, Xenodacnis parina
Slaty finch, Haplospiza rustica
Blue-black grassquit, Volatinia jacarina
Black-and-white tanager, Conothraupis speculigera
Rufous-crested tanager, Creurgops verticalis
Slaty tanager, Creurgops dentatus
Flame-crested tanager, Loriotus cristatus
Yellow-crested tanager, Loriotus rufiventer
White-shouldered tanager, Loriotus luctuosus
Fulvous-crested tanager, Tachyphonus surinamus
White-lined tanager, Tachyphonus rufus
Red-shouldered tanager, Tachyphonus phoenicius
Gray-headed tanager, Eucometis penicillata
Black-goggled tanager, Trichothraupis melanops
Inti tanager, Heliothraupis oneilli
Red-crested finch, Coryphospingus cucullatus
Masked crimson tanager, Ramphocelus nigrogularis
Black-bellied tanager, Ramphocelus melanogaster (E)
Silver-beaked tanager, Ramphocelus carbo
Flame-rumped tanager, Ramphocelus flammigerus
Fulvous shrike-tanager, Lanio fulvus
White-winged shrike-tanager, Lanio versicolor
Crimson-breasted finch, Rhodospingus cruentus
Short-billed honeycreeper, Cyanerpes nitidus
Purple honeycreeper, Cyanerpes caeruleus
Red-legged honeycreeper, Cyanerpes cyaneus
Swallow tanager, Tersina viridis
White-bellied dacnis, Dacnis albiventris
Black-faced dacnis, Dacnis lineata
Yellow-bellied dacnis, Dacnis flaviventer
Blue dacnis, Dacnis cayana
Lesson's seedeater, Sporophila bouvronides
Lined seedeater, Sporophila lineola
White-bellied seedeater, Sporophila leucoptera (H)
Parrot-billed seedeater, Sporophila peruviana
Chestnut-throated seedeater, Sporophila telasco
Drab seedeater, Sporophila simplex
Thick-billed seed-finch, Sporophila funerea (V)
Chestnut-bellied seedeater, Sporophila castaneiventris
Tawny-bellied seedeater, Sporophila hypoxantha (H)
Dark-throated seedeater, Sporophila ruficollis (H)
Chestnut-bellied seed-finch, Sporophila angolensis
Large-billed seed-finch, Sporophila crassirostris
Black-billed seed-finch, Sporophila atrirostris
Variable seedeater, Sporophila corvina
Wing-barred seedeater, Sporophila americana
Black-and-white seedeater, Sporophila luctuosa
Yellow-bellied seedeater, Sporophila nigricollis
Double-collared seedeater, Sporophila caerulescens
Slate-colored seedeater, Sporophila schistacea
Plumbeous seedeater, Sporophila plumbea
Buff-throated saltator, Saltator maximus
Bluish-gray saltator, Saltator coerulescens
Streaked saltator, Saltator striatipectus
Black-cowled saltator, Saltator nigriceps
Golden-billed saltator, Saltator aurantiirostris
Masked saltator, Saltator cinctus
Slate-colored grosbeak, Saltator grossus
Black-masked finch, Coryphaspiza melanotis
Wedge-tailed grass-finch, Emberizoides herbicola
Cinereous finch, Piezorina cinerea (E)
Slender-billed finch, Xenospingus concolor
Black-headed hemispingus, Pseudospingus verticalis
Drab hemispingus, Pseudospingus xanthophthalmus
Gray-hooded bush tanager, Cnemoscopus rubrirostris
Rufous-browed hemispingus, Poospiza rufosuperciliaris (E)
Rufous-breasted warbling finch, Poospiza rubecula (E)
Collared warbling finch, Poospiza hispaniolensis
Chestnut-breasted mountain finch, Poospizopsis caesar (E)
Black-capped hemispingus, Kleinothraupis atropileus
Parodi's hemispingus, Kleinothraupis parodii (E)
Orange-browed hemispingus, Kleinothraupis calophrys
Oleaginous hemispingus, Sphenopsis frontalis
Black-eared hemispingus, Sphenopsis melanotis
Orange-headed tanager, Thlypopsis sordida
Buff-bellied tanager, Thlypopsis inornata
Rust-and-yellow tanager, Thlypopsis ruficeps
Superciliaried hemispingus, Thlypopsis superciliaris
Rufous-chested tanager, Thlypopsis ornata
Brown-flanked tanager, Thlypopsis pectoralis (E)
Plain-tailed warbling finch, Microspingus alticola (E)
Three-striped hemispingus, Microspingus trifasciatus
Pardusco, Nephelornis oneilli (E)
Great Inca-finch, Incaspiza pulchra (E)
Rufous-backed Inca-finch, Incaspiza personata (E)
Gray-winged Inca-finch, Incaspiza ortizi (E)
Buff-bridled Inca-finch, Incaspiza laeta (E)
Little Inca-finch, Incaspiza watkinsi (E)
Bananaquit, Coereba flaveola
Dull-colored grassquit, Asemospiza obscura
Orange-eared tanager, Chlorochrysa calliparaea
Red-crested cardinal, Paroaria coronata (I)
Red-capped cardinal, Paroaria gularis
Black-faced tanager, Schistochlamys melanopis
Magpie tanager, Cissopis leverianus
Vermilion tanager, Calochaetes coccineus
Yellow-throated tanager, Iridosornis analis
Golden-collared tanager, Iridosornis jelskii
Golden-crowned tanager, Iridosornis rufivertex
Yellow-scarfed tanager, Iridosornis reinhardti (E)
Fawn-breasted tanager, Pipraeidea melanonota
Blue-and-yellow tanager, Rauenia bonariensis
Buff-breasted mountain tanager, Dubusia taeniata
Chestnut-bellied mountain tanager, Dubusia castaneoventris
Lacrimose mountain tanager, Anisognathus lacrymosus
Scarlet-bellied mountain tanager, Anisognathus igniventris
Blue-winged mountain tanager, Anisognathus somptuosus
Hooded mountain tanager, Buthraupis montana
Masked mountain tanager, Tephrospilus wetmorei
Blue-capped tanager, Sporathraupis cyanocephala
Grass-green tanager, Chlorornis riefferii
Black-chested mountain tanager, Cnemathraupis eximia
Golden-backed mountain tanager, Cnemathraupis aureodorsalis (E)
Orange-throated tanager, Wetmorethraupis sterrhopteron
Golden-naped tanager, Chalcothraupis ruficervix
Silvery tanager, Stilpnia viridicollis
Green-throated tanager, Stilpnia argyrofenges
Sira tanager, Stilpnia phillipsi (E)
Green-capped tanager, Stilpnia meyerdeschauenseei
Burnished-buff tanager, Stilpnia cayana
Masked tanager, Stilpnia nigrocincta
Blue-necked tanager, Stilpnia cyanicollis
Blue-and-black tanager, Tangara vassorii
Beryl-spangled tanager, Tangara nigroviridis
Metallic-green tanager, Tangara labradorides
Blue-browed tanager, Tangara cyanotis
Turquoise tanager, Tangara mexicana
Paradise tanager, Tangara chilensis
Opal-rumped tanager, Tangara velia
Opal-crowned tanager, Tangara callophrys
Bay-headed tanager, Tangara gyrola
Golden-eared tanager, Tangara chrysotis
Saffron-crowned tanager, Tangara xanthocephala
Flame-faced tanager, Tangara parzudakii
Green-and-gold tanager, Tangara schrankii
Golden tanager, Tangara arthus
Silver-throated tanager, Tangara icterocephala
Blue-gray tanager, Thraupis episcopus
Sayaca tanager, Thraupis sayaca (V)
Palm tanager, Thraupis palmarum
Dotted tanager, Ixothraupis varia
Yellow-bellied tanager, Ixothraupis xanthogastra
Spotted tanager, Ixothraupis punctata

Notes

References

See also
List of birds
Lists of birds by region

External links
Birds of Peru - World Institute for Conservation and Environment

Peru
birds
'
Peru